Among the individuals or fictional characters who have had rose cultivars named after them are the following:

A

 A. Drawriel (1887 — Leveque, France)
 Abbé André Reitter (1904  — Welter, Germany)
 Abbé Berliez (1864 — Guillot, France)
 Abbé Bramérel (1871 — Guillot, France)
 Abbé Giraudier (1869 — Levet, France)
 Abe Lincoln
 Abel Carrière (1875 — E. Verdier, France)
 Abelle Weber-Paté (1904 — Lambert)
 Abraham Darby (1985 — Austin, United Kingdom)
 Achille Gonod (1864 — Gonod, France)
 Adam Messerich (1920 — Lambert, Germany)
 Adélaïde de Meynot (1882 — Gonod, France)
 Adélaide d'Orléans (1826 — Jacques, France)
 Adelaide Hoodless
 Adèle Heu (1816 — Vibert, France)
 Adèle Pavie (1850 — Vibert, France)
 Adèle Prévost (1848)
 Ady Endre emleke (2004 — Mark, Hungary)
 Adolf Deegen (1935 — Böhm, Czechoslovakia)
 Adolf Horstmann (1971 — Kordes, Germany)
 Adolphe van den Heede (1904 — Lambert)
 Adrian Reverchon (1909 — Lambert)
 Aenne Burda (Kordes, Germany)
 Agar (1836 — Vibert, France)
 Agatha Christie (1988 — Kordes, Germany)
 Aglaïa (1811 — Descemet, France)
 Aglaia (II) (1896 — Lambert, Germany)
 Agnes Bernauer (1989 — Kordes, Germany)
 Agnes (1900 — Saunders, Canada)
 Agnes Schilliger (2002 — Guillot-Massad, France)
 Aimée Vibert (1828 — Vibert, France)
 Alain Blanchard (1839 — Vibert, France)
 Alain Souchon (2000 — Meilland, France)
 Alan Titchmarsh (2007 — Austin, United Kingdom)
 Albéric Barbier (1900 — Barbier, France)
 Alberich (1954 — De Ruiter, The Netherlands)
 Albert Edwards (1961 — Hillier, United Kingdom)
 Albert Hoffmann (1904 — Welter, Germany)
 Albert James Nottidge (1909 — Welter, Germany)
 Albert Payé (1873 — Tourais, France)
 Albert Poyet (1979 — Eve)
 Albrecht Dürer (2002 — Tantau, Germany)
 Alec C. Collie (Cocker, United Kingdom)
 'Alexander MacKenzie'(Canada)
 Alexandre Dumas (1861 — Margottin, France)
 Alexander Suddaby (1977 - London, United Kingdom)
 Alexandre Dupont (1892 — Liabaud, France)
 Alexandre Girault (1909 — Barbier, France)
 Alexandre Laquement (1906 — Roseraie de L'Hay, France)
 Alfieri (after 1800 — France)
 Alfred Colomb (1865 — Lacharme, France)
 Alfred de Dalmas (1855 — Portemer / Laffay, France)
 Alfred K. Williams (1877 — Schwartz, France)
 Admiral Tirpitz (1918 — Kiese, Germany)
 Alice Aldrich (1899 — Lovett, USA)
 Alice Hamilton (1904 — Nabonnand, France)
 Alice Hoffmann (1897 — Hoffmann, Germany)
 Alice Rauch (1909 — Geschwind, Austria-Hungary)
 Alice Vena
 Alida Lovett (1905 — Van Fleet, USA)
 Alison Wheatcroft (1959 — Wheatcroft, United Kingdom)

 Alister Stella Gray (1894 — Gray, United Kingdom)
 Alphonse Daudet (1997 — Meilland, France)
 Amadeus (II) (2003 — Kordes, Germany)
 Amadis (1829 —  Laffay, France)
 Amalia Jung (1934 — Leenders, The Netherlands)
 Amalie de Greiff (1912 — Lambert, Germany)
 Amandine Chanel (2004 — Massad, France)
 Ambroise Paré (1846 — Vibert, France)
 Amelia Earhart (1932 — Reymond, USA)
 Amélie Gravereaux (1900 — Gravereaux, France)
 Amélie Hoste (1875 — Gonod, France)
 Amy Robsart (1894 — Penzance, United Kingdom)
 Anaïs Ségalas (1837 — Vibert, France)
 Andenken an Alma de L'Aigle (1955 — Wohlt/Kordes, Germany)
 Anacréon (1836 — Vibert, France)
 Andenken an Ferdinand Hopf (1927 — Elbel, Germany)
 Andenken an Gustav Frahm (1956 — Kordes, Germany)
 Andenken an Joh. Diering (1902 — Hinner, Germany)
 Andenken an Erreth Jolànka (1916 — Welter, Germany)
 Andenken an Moritz von Fröhlich (1904 — Hinner, Germany)
 Andreas Hofer (1911 — Kiese, Germany)
 André Le Nôtre (2001 — Meilland, France)
 André Leroy d'Angers (1866 — Trouillard, France)
 Angela Müll (1902 — Hinner, Germany)
 Angela Rippon (1978 — De Ruiter Netherlands)
 Angela Welter (1903 — Welter, Germany)
 Angèle Pernet (1924 — Pernet-Ducher, France)
 Angels Mateu (1934 — Dot, Spain)
 Angyal Dezső emléke (2000 — Mark, Hungary)
 Anikó (1994 — Mark, Hungary)
 Anisley Dickson  (1983 — Dickson, United Kingdom)
 Ann Saxby (1997 — Austin, United Kingdom)

 Anna de Besobrasoff (1878 — Gonod, France)
 Anna de Diesbach (1859 — Lacharme, France)
 Anna Ford (1980 — Harkness, United Kingdom)
 Anna Geschwind (1882  — Geschwind, Austria-Hungary)
 Anna Marie de Montravel (1879 — Rambeaux, France)
 Anna Pavlova (1891 — Beales, United Kingdom)
 Anna Rubsamen (1903 — Weigand, France)
 Anna Scharsach (1890 — Geschwind, Austria-Hungary)
 Anna Schneider (1912 — Welter, Germany)
 Anna Zinkeisen (1983 — Harkness, United Kingdom)
 Annamarie Jacobs (1911 — Jacobs, Germany)
 Ännchen Müller (1907 — J.C. Schmidt, Germany)
 Ännchen von Tharau (1886 — Geschwind, Austria-Hungary)
 Anne Boleyn (1993 — Austin, United Kingdom)
 Anne Cocker (1970 — Cocker, United Kingdom)
 Anne de Bretagne (1979 — Meilland, France)
 Anne Harkness (1979 — Harkness, United Kingdom)
 Anne Marie de Montravel  (1879 — Rambaux, France)
 Anne-Marie d'Orbesson (1820 — Jacques, France)
 Anne Marie Trechslin (1968 — Meilland, France)
 Anne-Mette Poulsen (1935 — Poulsen, Denmark)
 Anne of Geierstein (1894 — Penzance, United Kingdom)
 Anneliese Rothenberger (1975 — Tantau, Germany)
 Anni Welter (1912 — Welter, Germany)
 Anthony Meilland (1990 — Meilland, France)
 Antigone (1969 — Gaujard, France)
 Antoine Devert (1880 — Gonod, France)
 Antoine Ducher (1826 — Ducher, France)
 Antoine Mouton (1874 — Levet, France)
 Antoine Rivoire (1895 — Pernet-Ducher, France)
 Antonia d'Ormois (1835 — Vibert, France)
 Antonia Ridge (1976 — Meilland, France)
 Antonie Schurz (1890 — Geschwind, Austria-Hungary)
 Anuschka (1977 — Tantau, Germany)
 Aphrodite (2006 — Tantau, Germany)

 Apor Vilmos emléke (1994 — Mark, Hungary)
 Apotheker Georg Höfer (1902 — Welter, Germany)
 Áprily Lajos emléke (2000 — Mark, Hungary)
 Arany János emléke (2006 — Mark, Hungary)
 Archiduc Charles (1825 — Laffay, France)
 Archiduc Joseph (1892 — Nabonnand, France)
 Archiduchesse Elisabeth d'Autriche (1881 — Moreau-Robert, France)
 Ariana El (1912 — Geschwind, Austria-Hungary)
 Arielle Dombasle (1992 — Meilland, France)
 Arillaga (1929 — Schoener, USA)
 Aristide Briand (1928 — Penny, France)
 Arlene Francis (1957 — Boerner/Jackson and Perkins, USA)
 Armide (1817 — Vibert, France)
 Arndt (1913 — Lambert, Germany)
 Arpad-hazi Szent Erzsebet emléke (1995 — Mark, Hungary)
 Arthur Bell (1965 — McGredy, Ireland)
 Arthur de Sansal (1855 — Cochet, France)
 Arthur Rimbaud (2008 — Meilland, France)
 Arthur Scargill
 Arthur Young (1863 — Portemer, France)
 Arva Leany (1911 — Geschwind, Austria-Hungary)
 Asta von Parpart (1909 — Geschwind, Austria-Hungary)
 Astra Desmond (United Kingdom)
 Astrid Gräfin von Hardenberg (2001 — Tantau, Germany)
 Astrid Lindgren (1989 — Olesen, Denmark)
 Athena (1982 — Kordes, Germany)
 Audie Murphy (1957 — Lammerts, USA)
 Audrey Hepburn (1983 — Twomey, USA)
 Audrey Wilcox (1987 — Fryer, United Kingdom)
 August Seebauer (1944 — Kordes, Germany)
 Augusta Luise (1999 — Tantau, Germany)
Kaiserin Auguste Viktoria (1891 — Lambert, Germany)
 Auguste Gervais (1918 — Barbier, France)
 Auguste Kordes (1928 — Kordes, Germany)
 Auguste Renoir (1995 — Meilland, France)
 Auguste Roussel (1913 — Barbier, France)
 Augustine Guinoisseau (1889 — Guinoisseau, France)
 Augustine Halem (1891 — Guillot, France)
 Augustus Hartmann (1914 — Cant, Germany)
 Aurelia Liffa (1886 — Geschwind, Austria-Hungary)
 Aurora (1923 — Pemberton, United Kingdom)
 Aurore de Jacques-Marie (1999 — Guillot, France)
 Aurore Poniatowska (1820 — Du Pont, Paris, France)
 Ausonius (1932 — Lambert, Germany)
 Aviateur Blériot (1909 — Fauqué, France)
 Avocat Duvivier (1875 — Lévêque, France)
Top of page

B

 Barbara Austin (1997 — Austin, United Kingdom)
 Barbara Bush (1978 — Warriner, USA)
 Barbara Carrera (1994 — Beales, United Kingdom)
 Barbara Mandrell (1990 — King, USA)
 Barbra Streisand (2001 — Carruth, USA)
 Barbarossa (1906 — Welter, Germany)
 Bardou Job (1887 — Nabonnand, France)
 Báró Natália (1889 — Geschwind, Austria-Hungary)
 Baron Alexandre de Vrints (1880 — Gonod, France)
 Baron de Bonstetten (1871 — Liabaud, France)
 Baron Girod de l'Ain (1897 — Reverchon, France)
 Baron de Wassenaer (1854 — Verdier, France)
 Baron J. B. Gonella (1859 — Guillot, France)
 Baron Palm (1913 — Lambert, Germany)
 Baron van Pallandt (1905 — Welter, Germany)
 Baronin Armgard von Biel (1905 — Jacobs, Germany)
 Baronne Adolphe de Rothschild (1862 — Lacharme, France)
 Baronne Caroline von Rothschild (1868 — Jean Pernet, père, France)
 Baronne de Fontvieille (1886 — Gonod, France)
 Baronne de Sinétry (1883 — Gonod, France)
 Baronne Edmond de Rothschild (1968 — Meilland, France)
 Baronne Henriette de Snoy (1897 — Bernaix, France)
 Baronne Prévost (1842 — Desprez, France)
 Belle Bigottini (1825 — Laffay and Noisette, France)
 Belle Isis (1845 — Parmentier, Belgium)
 Belmonte (2007 — Harkness, United Kingdom)
 Benjamin Britten (2001 — Austin, United Kingdom)
 Benoit Broyer (1875 — Gonod, France)
 Béranger (1849 — Vibert, France)
 Bergrat Otto Berger (1924 — Berger, Germany)
 Bernard (1818 — Robert, France)
 Bernd Weigel (2003 — Tantau, Germany)
 Bertrand Amoussou (2007 — Reuter, France)
 Betty Harkness (1998 — Harkness, United Kingdom)
 Betty Prior (1935 — Prior, United Kingdom)
 Betty Sheriff (1788)
 Betty Uprichard (1922 — Dickson, United Kingdom)
 Betty White (2004 — USA)
 Billy Graham (1998 — Zary, USA)
 Bing Crosby (1981 — Weeks, USA)
 Bischof Dr. Korum (1921 — Lambert, Germany)
 Bishop Darlington (1926 — Thomas, USA)
 Blanche Lafitte (1851 — Pradel, France)
 Blanchefleur (1835 — Vibert, France)
 Bob Hope (1960 — Kordes, Germany)
 Bobbie James (1961 — James, United Kingdom)
 Bobby Charlton (1974 — Fryer, United Kingdom)
 Bobby James (Rambler, Sunningdale Nursery, 1961)
 Botticelli (2004 — Meilland, France)
 Botzaris (1856 — Robert, France)
 Bougainville (1822 — Cochet, France)
 Bourbon Queen (1835 — Mauget, France)
 Brenda Colvin (1970 — Colvin, United Kingdom)
 Brenda Lee (1990 — USA)
 Brennus (1830 — Laffay, France)
 Brigitte Bardot (2001 — Orard, France)
 Brigitte de Villenfagne (1993 — Lens, Belgium)
 British Queen (1912 — McGredy, Ireland)
 Bürgermeister Christen  Bergmann (1911 — Teschendorff, Germany)
Top of page

C

Caecilie Scharsach (1887 — Geschwind, Austria-Hungary)
Camille Bernardin (1865 — Gautreau, France)
Camille Pissarro (1996 — Delbard, France)
Camoëns (1881 — Schwartz, France)
Capitaine Basroger (1890 — Moreau-Robert, France)
Captain Bligh (1938 — Fitzhardinge, Australia)
Capitaine Dyel de Graville (1907 — Boutigny, France)
Capitaine Williams (1835 — France)
Captain Hayward (1893 — Bennett, United Kingdom)
Captain John Ingram (1856 — Laffay, France)
Captain Philip Green (1899 — Nabonnand, France)
Cardinal Hume (1984 — Harkness, United Kingdom)
Cardinal de Richelieu (1847 — Parmentier, Belgium)
Carmen (1906 — Lambert, Germany)
Caroline Bank (1889 — Geschwind, Austria-Hungary)
Caroline Schmitt (1878 — J.C. Schmidt, Germany)
Caron Keating (2005 — Harkness, United Kingdom)
Cary Grant (1987 — Meilland, France)
Casanova (1964 — McGreedy, Ireland)
Casimir Moullé (1911 — Barbier, France)
Catherine Deneuve (1981 — Meilland, France)
Catherine de Württemberg (1843 — Robert, France)
Catherine Guillot (1861 — Guillot, France)
Catherine Mermet (1869 — Guillot, France)
Catherine Seyton (1894 — Penzance, United Kingdom)
Cécile Brünner (1880 — Ducher, France)
Cécile Brünner Climbing (1904 — Hosp, USA)
Céline Forestier (1842 — Trouillard, France)
Céline Gonod 1861 — Gonod, France)
Celsiana (cca. 1750)
Ceres (1914 — Pemberton, United Kingdom)
César (1993 — Meilland, France)
Chamisso (1922 — Lambert, Germany)
Chantal Merieux (1999 — Guillot-Massad, France)
Charlemagne (1836 — Dorizy, France)
Charles Albanel (1981 — Svejda, Canada)
Charles Austin (1973 — Austin, United Kingdom)
Charles Aznavour (1988 — Meilland, France) 
Charles de Gaulle (1975 — Meilland, France)
Charles de Lapisse (1910 — Laroulandie, France)
Charles de Mills (1790 — France)
Charles Dickens (1886 — Paul, United Kingdom)
Charles Lawson (1853 — Lawson, United Kingdom)
Charles Lefèbvre (1862 — Lacharme, France)
Charles Mallerin (1951 — Meilland, France)
Charles Margottin (1864 — Margottin, France)
Charles Rennie Mackintosh (1988 — David Austin, United Kingdom)
Charlotte Armstrong (1940 — Lammerts, United States)
Charlotte Ewert (1994 — Scholle, Germany)
Charlotte Klemm (1905 — Türke, Germany),
Charlotte Rampling (1988 — Meilland, France)
Chaucer (1970 — Austin, United Kingdom)
Chief Seattle (1951 — Swim & Armstrong, USA)
Chloris (1820 — Descemet, France)
Chopin (1980 — Żyła, Poland)
Chris Evert (1997 — Carruth, United Kingdom)
Christian Curle (1909 — Cocker, United Kingdom)
Christian Dior (1958 — France)
Christian Schultheis (1999 — Schultheis, Germany)
Christiane Hörbiger (1988 — McGreedy, New Zealand)
Christine Wright (1909 — Hoopes, USA)
Christl Flocke (1995 — Scholle, Germany)
Christopher Columbus (1992 — Meilland, France)
Christophe de Combejean (2004 — Massad, France)
Christopher Marlowe (2002 — Austin, United Kingdom)
Cicely Lascelles (1932 — Clark, Australia)
Cicely O'Rorke (1937 — Clark, Australia)
Cilly Michel (1928 — Felberg, Germany)
Claire Laberge (2001 — Fleming)
Claire Rayner (1931 — Jones, United Kingdom)
Claire Rose (1986 — Austin, United Kingdom)
Clarissa (1983 — Harkness, United Kingdom)
Claude Brasseur (2006 — Meilland, France)
Claude Monet (1982 — Delbard, France)
Claudia Cardinale (1997 — Guillot-Massad, France)
Claus Groth (1951 — Tantau, Germany)
Cleopatra (1994 — Kordes, Germany)
Clio (1894 — Paul, United Kingdom)
Clytemnestra (1915 — Pemberton, United Kingdom)
Colette (1995 — Meilland, France)
Commandant Beaurepaire (1874 — Moreau-Robert, France)
Commandant Cousteau (1993 — Adam, France)
Commandeur Jules Gravereaux (1909 — Croibier, France) 1909
Comte de Chambord (1860 — Moreau-Robert, France)
Comte de Nanteuil (II) (1850 — Quetier, France)
Comte de Paris (1886 — Leveque, France)
Comtes de Champagne (2001 — Austin, United Kingdom)
Comte G. de Rochemur (1911 — Schwartz, France)
Comtesse Brigitte Chandon-Moët (1997 — Dorieux, France)
Comtesse Cécile de Chabrillant (1858 — France)
Comtesse Cécile de Forton (1916 — Nabonnand, France)
Comtesse d'Oxford (1869 — Guillot, France)
Comtesse de Caserta (1878 — Nabonnand, France)
Comtesse de Cassagne (1919 — Guillot, France)
Comtesse de Lacepede (1940 — France)
Comtesse de Leusse (1878 - Nabonnand, France)
Comtesse de Murinais (1843 — Vibert, France)
Comtesse de Noghera (1902 — Nabonnand, France)
Comtesse de Ségur (1994 — Delbard, France)
Comtesse Diana  (1993 — Hetzel, Germany)
Comtesse du Barry (1993 — Verschuren, The Netherlands)
Comtesse du Cayla (1902 — Guillot, France)
Comtesse Risa du Parc (1876 — Schwartz, France)
Comtesse Vandal (1932 — Leenders, The Netherlands)
Condesa de Barcelona (1988 — Ferrer, Spain)
Condesa de Mayalde (1956 — Dot, Spain)
Condesa de Sástago (1930 — Dot, Spain)
Conrad Ferdinand Meyer (1899 — Dr. Müller, Switzerland)
Constance Finn (1997 — Harkness, United Kingdom)
Constance Spry (1961 — Austin, United Kingdom)
Coralie (before 1848 — France)
Cornelia (1925 — Pemberton, United Kingdom)
Corporal Johann Nagy (1890 — Geschwind, Austria-Hungary)
Cosimo Ridolfi (1842 — Vibert, France)
Coupe d'Hébé (1840 — Laffay, France)
Countess of Oxford (1869 — Guillot, France)
Countess of Stradbroke (1928 — Clark, Australia)
Countess of Wessex (2004 — Beales, United Kingdom)
Cristoforo Colombo (1953 — Aicardi, Italy)
Crown Princess Margareta (2000 — Austin, United Kingdom)
Crown Princess Mary (2006 — Australia)
Cymbaline (1982 — Austin, United Kingdom)
Cuthbert Grant (1967 — Canada)
Cyrano (1954 — Gaujard, France)
Top of page

D
 D'Aguesseau (1836 — Vibert, France)
 Dagmar Späth (1935 — Späth, Germany)
 Dame Edith Helen (1926 — Dickson, United Kingdom)
 Dame of Sark (1976 — Harkness, United Kingdom)
 Dame Prudence (1969 — Austin, United Kingdom)
 Dame Wendy (1991 — Cants, United Kingdom)
 Dan Poncet (1999 — Guillot-Massad, France)
 Danaë (1913 — Pemberton, United Kingdom)
 Dany Hahn (2004 — Guillot, France)
 Daphné (1819 - Vibert, France)
 Daphne (1962, Leenders, Netherlands)
 Darius (1827 — Laffay, France)
 David Thompson (1970 — Svejda, Canada)
 De la Grifferaie (1845- Vibert, France)
 Dee Bennett (1988 — Saville, USA)
 Dee Dee Bridgewater (2003 — Meilland, France)
 Delambre (1863 — Moreau-Robert, France)
 Della Balfour (1994 — Harkness, United Kingdom)
 Dembrowski (1849 — Vibert, France)
 Denise Hilling (1965 — Hilling, France)
 Désirée Parmentier (1941 — Parmentier, Belgium)

 Deuil de Paul Fontaine (1873 — Fontaine, France)
 Deuil du Prince Albert  (1862 — Lapente, France)
 Detlev von Liliencron (1915 — Lambert, Germany)
 Diana (1977 — Tantau, Germany)
 Diana, Princess of Wales (1998 — Zary, USA)
 Dieter Müller (2005 — Delbart, France)
 Dieter Wedel (1997 — Dickson, United Kingdom)
 Director W. Cordes (1905 — Lambert, Germany)
 Direktor Benshop (1945 — Tantau, Germany)

 Dolly Parton (1984 — USA)
 Dometil Beccard (1853 — France)
 Domkapitular Dr. Lager (1903 — Lambert, Germany)
 Donna Marie (1830- Vibert, France)
 Dora Hansen (1911 — Jacobs, Germany)
 Doris Tysterman (1975 — Tysterman, United Kingdom)
 Dorothea Söffker — (1899 — Welter, Germany)
 Dorothy Perkins (1901 — Miller, USA)
 Dorothy Wheatcroft (1960 — Tantau, Germany)
 Dorothy Whitney Wood (1992 — Fryer, United Kingdom)
 Dorothy Wilson (1995 — Beales, United Kingdom)

 Dr. Andry (1864 — Verdier, France)
 Dr. Augustin Wibbelt (1928 — Leenders, The Netherlands)
 Dr. Bender (1914 — Lambert, Germany)
 Dr. Christian Friedrich Samuel Hahnemann (2006 — Huber, Switzerland)
 Dr. Debat (1948 — Meilland, France)
 Dr. Dick (1985 — Cocker, United Kingdom)
 Dr. Eckener (1928 — V. Berger, Germany)
 Dr. Georges Martin (1908 — Vilin, France)
 Dr. Gustav Krüger (1913 — Ulbrich/Kiese, Germany)
 Dr. Harry Upshall (1986 - Fleming, Canada)
 Dr. Heinrich Lumpe (1928 — V. Berger, Germany)
 Dr. Helfferich (1919 — Lambert, Germany)
 Dr. Huey (1914 — G. Thomas, USA)
 Dr. Ing. H. Blohm (1919 — Lambert, Germany)
 Dr. John Snow (1979 — Gandy, United Kingdom)
 Dr. Karel Kramář (1937 — Böhm, Czechoslovakia)
 Dr. Martin Luther (2000 — Scholle, Germany)
 Dr. Masaryk (1930 — Böhm, Czechoslovakia)
 Dr. Omar Zawawi (2000 - Schmadlak, Germany)
 Dr. Rudolf Maag (1968, Meilland, France)
 Dr. Reiner Klimke (1988 — Noack, Germany)
 Dr. Rouges (1893 — Schwartz, France)
 Dr. Valentin Teirich (1890 — Geschwind, Austria-Hungary)
 Dr. W. van Fleet (1910 — Van Fleet, USA)
 Dr. Waldheim (1974 — Kordes, Germany)
 Druschki Rubra (1929 — Lambert, Germany)

 Duc d'Aremberg (1836 — Parmentier, Belgium)
 Duc d'Audiffret-Pasquier (France)
 Duc d'Aumale (France)
 Duc de Bragance (France)
 Duc de Bordeaux (1820 — Vibert, France)
 Duc de Cambridge (1800 — Laffay, France)
 Duc de Cazes (1861 — Touvais, France)
 Duc de Constantine (1857 — Soupert & Notting, France)
 Duc de Malakoff (France)
 Duc de Fitz-James (1885 — France)
 Duc de Guiche (1835 — Prévost, France)
 Duc de Montpensier (France)
 Duc de Rohan (1847 — Lévêque,  France)
 Duc de Rohan (1861 — Lévêque, France)
 Duc de Wellington (1864 — Granger, France)
 Duc d'Orléans (France)

 Duchesse de Brabant (1857 - Bernède, France)
 Duchesse de Grammont (before 1838)
 Duchesse de Verneuil (1856 - Portemer)
 Duchess of Bedford (1879 — Postans, United Kingdom)
 Duchess of Connaught (1879 — Bennett, United Kingdom)
 Duchess of Connaught (1882 — Standish & Noble, United Kingdom)
 Duchess of Cornwall (2005 — Tantau, United Kingdom)
 Duchess of Edinburgh (1874 — Bennett, United Kingdom)
 Duchess of Fife (United Kingdom)
 Duchess of Kent (1968 — Waterhouse, United Kingdom)
 Duchess of Sutherland (1839 — Laffay, France)
 Duchess of Portland (1775 — Italy)
 Duchess of Wellington (1909 - Dickson, United Kingdom)
 Duchess of York  (1897 — Cocker, United Kingdom)
 Duchess of York (1926 — Hazlewood Bros., Australia)
 Duchess of York (1994 — Dickson, United Kingdom)
 Duchesse Antonine d'Ursel (France)
 Duchesse d'Abrantès (1851 — Robert, France)
 Duchesse d'Angoulême (1828 — Vibert, France)
 Duchesse d'Aoste (France)
 Duchesse d'Auerstedt (1888 — Bernaix, France)
 Duchesse de Berry (1818 - Vibert, France)
 Duchesse de Brabant (1857 — Bernède, France)
 Duchesse de Bragance (France)
 Duchesse de Buccleugh (1837 — Vibert, France)
 Duchesse de Buccleugh (1846 — Robert, France)
 Duchesse de Cambacérès (France)
 Duchesse de Caylus (France)
 Duchesse de Dino (before 1829 — France)
 Duchesse de Dino (1889 — Lévêque, France)
 Duchesse de Galliera (1847 — Portemer, France)
 Duchesse de Grammont (before 1838)
 Duchesse de Magenta (France)
 Duchesse de Montebello (1825 —  Laffay, France)
 Duchesse de Montpensier (France)
 Duchesse de Morny (France)
 Duchesse de Nemours (France)
 Duchesse de Norfolk (France)
 Duchesse de Polignac (France)
 Duchesse de Rohan (1847 — Lévêque, France)
 Duchesse de Rohan (1858 — France)
 Duchesse de Vallombrosa (1876 — Schwartz, France)
 Duchesse de Verneuil (1856 — Portemer)
 Duchesse d'Orléans (1820 — Jacques, France)

 Duchesse d'Orléans (1851 — Quétier, France)
 Duchesse d'Ossuna (France)
 Duhamel du Monceau (France)
 Duke of Albany (United Kingdom)
 Duke of Connaught (1875 — Paul, United Kingdom)
 Duke of Connaught (1879 — Bennett, United Kingdom)
 Duke of Edinburgh (1868 — Paul, United Kingdom)
 Duke of Edinburgh (2021 — Harkness, United Kingdom)
 Duke of Fife (United Kingdom)
 Duke of Teck (United Kingdom)
 Duquesa de Peñaranda (1931 — Dot, Spain)
Top of page

E

 E. G. Hill (1929 — Hill, USA)
 Earl of Dufferin (Dickson, United Kingdom)
 Earl of Pembroke (1882 — Bennett, United Kingdom)
 Eckart Witzigmann (2001 — Delbard, France)
 Edgar Degas (2002 — Delbard, France)
 Edith Bellenden (1895 — Penzance, United Kingdom)
 Édith de Murat (1858 —  Ducher, France)
 Edith Holden (1988 — Warner, United Kingdom)
 Edith Krause (1930 — Krause, Germany)
 Édith Piaf (I)  (1964 — Verbeek, The Netherlands)
 Édith Piaf (2007 — Meilland, France)
 Edmond Proust (1903 — Barbier, France)
 Edouard Guillot (2004 — Guillot, France)
 Edu Meyer (1904 — Lambert, Germany)
 Edward VII Royal Edward Rose, Canada  
 Eileen O'Neill (2000 — Harkness, United Kingdom)
 Elfi von Dassanowsky (2009 — Jalbert, Canada)
 Eliane Gillet (1998 — Guillot-Massad, France)
 Elie Lambert (1898 — Lambert, Germany)
 Elisabeth (1926 — Alfons, Germany)
 Elise Heymann (1891 —  Strassheim, Germany)
 Eliza
 Elizabeth Harkness (1969  — Harkness, United Kingdom)
 Elizabeth Stuart (2003 — Guillot, France)
 Elizabeth Taylor
 Elke Gönewein (1974 — Gönewein, Germany)
 Ellen Willmott (1936 — Archer, United Kingdom)
 Ellen Zinnow (1930 — Krause, Germany)
 Elli Hartmann (1912 — Welter, Germany)
 Ellinor LeGrice (1959 — LeGrice, United Kingdom)

 Elly J. Nieborg (2006 — Nieborg, Germany)
 Elmar Gunsch (2001 — Scholle, Germany)
 Else Poulsen (1924 — Poulsen, Denmark)
 Elvis (2004 — Adam, France)
 Emmanuelle (1985 — Austin, United Kingdom)
 Emil Simmer (1910 — Türke, Germany)
 Emil Nolde (2001 — Tantau, Germany)
 Emilien Guillot (2001 — Guillot-Massad, France)
 Emily Carr
 Emily Gray (1918 — Williams, United Kingdom)

 Emmy von Dippe (1915 — Lambert, Germany)
 Empereur du Maroc  (1858 —  Guinoisseau, France)
 Empress Michiko (1992 — Dickson, United Kingdom)
 Empress Josephine (1853 — Paris)
 Ena Baxter (1989 — Cocker, United Kingdom)
 Ena Harkness (1946 — Harkness, United Kingdom)
 Ena Harkness Climbing (1954 — Murrell, United Kingdom)
 Eos (1950 — Ruys, The Netherlands)
 Erato (1937 — Tantau, Germany)
 Erbprinzessin Leopold von Anhalt (1933 —  Behrens, Germany)
 Erbprinzessin von Ratibor (1893 — Türke, Germany)
 Erika Teschendorff (1949 — Berger, Germany)
 Erinnerung an Loni Westermann (1907 — Welter, Germany)
 Erna Teschendorff (1911 —  Zschöckel-Teschendorff, Germany)
 Ernst G. Dörell (1888 — Geschwind, Austria-Hungary)
 Ernst Grandpierre (1900 — Weigand, Germany)
 Ernst Willner (1888 — Geschwind, Austria-Hungary)
 Esther (1819 — Vibert, France) 
 Esther Ofarim (1970 — Kordes, Germany)
 Esther's Baby (1979 — Harkness, United Kingdom)
 Eugen E. Marlitt (1900 — Geschwind, Austria-Hungary)
 Eugen Fürst (1875 — Soupert & Notting, Luxemburg)
 Eugène Savary (1872– Gonod, France)
 Eugénie Guinoisseau (1864 — Guinoisseau, France)
 Eugenie Lamesch (1899 — Lambert, Germany)
 Euphrosyne (1896 — Lambert, Germany)
 Eva (1937 —  Kordes, Germany)
 Evita II (2000 — Cocker, United Kingdom)
 Eva Teschendorff Climbing (1926 — Opdebeeck, Belgium)
 Evangeline (1906 — Walsh, USA)
 Eveline Timm (Weihrauch, Germany)
 Evelyn May (2000 — Beales, United Kingdom)
 Excellenz Kuntze (1909 — Lambert, Germany)
 Excellenz M. Schmidt-Metzler (1910 — Lambert, Germany)
Top of page

F

 Falstaff (1999 — Austin, United Kingdom)
 Fanny Bias (1819 — Vibert, France)
 Fanny Elßler  (1835 — Vibert, France)
 Fantin Latour (1840 — France)
 Felberg-Leclerc  (Jacobs, Germany)
 Felicia (1928 — Pemberton, United Kingdom)
 Felicitas (1998 — Kordes, Germany)
 Félicité et Perpétue (1827 — Jacques, France)
 Félicité Bohain (1865 — France)
 Felicité Parmentier (1834 -Parmentier France)
 Felicity Kendal (1985 — Sealand, United Kingdom)
 Felix Leclerc (2007 — Canada)
 Fellemberg (1857 — Fellemberg, Germany)
 Fenja (1965 — Petersen, Denmark)
 Ferdinand Chaffolte (1879 — Pernet, France)
 Ferdinand Pichard (1921 — Tanne, France)
 Ferry Porsche (1971 — Kordes, Germany)
 First Lady Martha Washington (cca. 1889 — unknown parentage, USA)
 Florence Delattre (1991 — Massad, France)
 Florence Nightingale (1989 — Gandy, United Kingdom)
 Foley Hobbs (Mrs.) Rose named for her in 1910. Resident of Malvern. Photographed 1917.
 Fornarina (1862 — Robert et Moreau, France)
 Forstmeisters Heim (1886 — Geschwind, Austria-Hungary)
 Francesca (1922, Pemberton, United Kingdom)
 Francine Austin (1988 — Austin, United Kingdom)
 Pope Francis (2015 — Nurseries and Roseraies Paul Croix, France)
 Francis Blaise (1999 — Guillot-Massad, France)
 Francis Dubreuil (1894 — Dubreuil, France)
 Francis E. Lester (1946 — Lester, USA)

 François Coppée (1895 — Lédéchaux, France)
 François d'Arago (1858 — Trouillard, France)
 François Juranville (1906 — Barbier, France)
 François Poisson (1902 — Barbier, France)
 François Rabelais (1997 — Meilland, France)
 Franz Pöhls (1909 — Jacobs, Germany)
 Frau Alexander Weiß (1909 — Lambert, Germany)
 Frau Alfred Mauthner (1907 — Lambert, Germany)
 Frau Anna Hinner (1909 — Hinner, Germany)
 Frau Anna Lautz (1912 — Kiese, Germany)
 Frau Anne Beaufays (1962 — De Ruiter, Netherlands)
 Frau Bertha Kiese (1913 — Jacobs, Germany)
 Frau Bürgermeister Kirschstein (1907 — Jacobs, Germany)
 Frau Cecilie Walter (1904 — Lambert, Germany)
 Frau Dr. Burghardt (1900 — Welter, Germany)
 Frau Dr. E. Skibinska (Geschwind, Austria-Hungary)
 Frau Dr. Schricker (1927 — Felberg, Germany)
 Frau Eduard Bethge (1930 — Felberg-Leclerc, Germany)
 Frau Else Krech (1915 — Welter, Germany)
 Frau Ernst Borsig (1907 — Lambert, Germany)
 Frau Eva Schubert (1937- Tepelmann, Germany)
 Frau Franziska Krüger (1880 — Nabonnand, France)
 Frau Frieda Croissant (1911 — Welter, Germany)
 Frau Geheimrat Dr. Staub (1908 — Lambert, Germany)
 Frau Geheimrat von Boch (1897 — Lambert, Germany)
 Frau H. Stakemann (1922 — Lambert, Germany)
 Frau Hans Drazil (1907 — Welter, Germany)
 Frau Hedwig Koschel (1921 — Münch & Haufe, Germany)
 Frau Hedwig Wagner (1919 — Krüger/Kiese, Germany)
 Frau Helene Videnz (1904 — Lambert, Germany)
 Frau Hilde Nicolai (1916 — Welter, Germany)
 Frau Ida Münch  (1919 — Beschnidt/Münch & Haufe, Germany)
 Frau J. Reiter (1904 — Welter, Germany)

 Frau Karl Druschki (1901 — Lambert, Germany)
 Frau Käthe Roth (1911 — Welter, Germany)
 Frau Lilla Rautenstrauch (1903 — Lambert, Germany)
 Frau Lina Straßheim (1907 — Strassheim, Germany)
 Frau Mathilde Bätz (1920 — Felberg-Leclerc, Germany)
 Frau Mathilde Noehl (1913 — Welter, Germany)
 Frau O. Plegg (1909 — Nabonnand, France)
 Frau Oberhofgärtner Luiger (1908 — Lambert, Germany)
 Frau Oberhofgärtner Schulze (1909 — Lambert, Germany)
 Frau Oberhofgärtner Singer (1908 — Lambert, Germany)
 Frau Ottilie Lüntzel (1909 — Lambert, Germany)
 Frau Otto Evertz (1907 — Welter, Germany)
 Frau Peter Lambert (1902 — Welter/Lambert, Germany)
 Frau Philipp Siesmayer (1908 — Lambert, Germany)
 Frau Prof. Gnau (1925 — Kiese, Germany)
 Frau Robert Türke (1923 — Türke, Germany)
 Frau Syndica Roeloffs (1900 — Lambert, Germany)
 Frau Therese Lang (1910 — Welter, Germany)
 Frau von Brauer (1913 — Lambert, Germany)
 Frau Viktoria von Thusansky (1888 — Geschwind, Austria-Hungary)
 Fräulein Octavia Hesse (1909 — Hesse, Germany)

 Fred Loads (1968 — Holmes, United Kingdom)
 Fred Streeter (1951 — Jackman, USA)
 Freddy Quinn (1989 — Pearce, United Kingdom)
 Freddie Mercury (1993 — Battersby, United Kingdom)
 Frederyk Chopin (1988 — Zyla, Poland)
 Frédéric Mistral (1995 — Meilland, France)
 Frédéric II de Prusse (1847 — Verdier, France)
 Freifrau Anna von Münchhausen (1911 — Welter, Germany)
 Freifrau Ella von Wangenheim (1907 — Jacobs, Germany)
 Freifrau Ida von Schubert (1911 — Lambert, Germany)
 Freifrau von der Goltz (1913 — Lambert, Germany)
 Freiherr von Marschall (1903 — Lambert, Germany)
 Freiherr von Schilling (1904 — Jacobs, Germany)
 Frieda Krause (1935 — Krause, Germany)

 Friedrich Alfred Krupp (1903 — Welter, Germany)
 Friedrich Harms (1901 — Hinner/Welter, Germany)
 Friedrich Schröder (1903 — Hinner, Germany)
 Fritz Nobis (1940 —  Kordes, Germany)
 Fritz Reuter (1913 — Lambert, Germany)
 Fritz Thiedemann (1959 — Tantau, Germany)
 Fritz Walter (1987 — Hetzel, Germany)
 Fru Dagmar Hastrup  (1901 — Herts, Denmark)
 Fru Dagmar Hastrup (1914 — Hastrup/Poulsen, Denmark)
 Fürst Bismarck (1886 — Drogemüller, Germany)
 Fürst Leopold IV zu Schaumburg-Lippe (1918 — Kiese, Germany)
 Fürstin von Pless (1911 — Lambert, Germany)
Top of page

G

 Gabriela Sabatini (1992 — United States)
 Gabrielle Noyelle (1933 — Buatois, France)
 Gartenarchitekt Günther Schulze (1991 — Austin, United Kingdom)
 Gartendirektor Otto Linne (1934 — Lambert, Germany)
 Gartendirektor Ries (1916 — J.C. Schmidt, Germany)
 Gebrüder Grimm (2002 — Germany)
 Geheimrat Dr. Mittweg (1909 — Lambert, Germany)
 Geheimrat Richard Willstätter (1931 — Felberg, Germany)
 Gellert (1917 — Lambert, Germany)
 Gemma (2003 — Harkness, United Kingdom)
 Gene Boerner (1968 — Boerner, USA)
 Général Cavaignac (1848 — Foulard, France)
 Général Desaix (1867 — Moreau-Robert, France)
 Général Galliéni (1899 — Nabonnand, France)
 General Jacqueminot (1853 — Rousselet, France)
 Général Kléber (1856 — Robert, France)
 General McArthur (1905 — Hill, USA)
General Superior Arnold Janssen (1912 — Leenders, The Netherlands)
 Général Tétard (1918 — Pajotin-Chédane, France)
 Generalin Isenbart (1915 — Lambert, Germany)
 Generaloberst Hindenburg (1915 — Lambert, Germany)
 Generaloberst von Kluck (1916 — Lambert, Germany)
 Geoff Hamilton (1997 — Austin, United Kingdom)
 Georg Arends  (1910 — Hinner, Germany)
 George Burns (1996 — Carruth, USA)
 George Dickson (1912 — Dickson, United Kingdom)
 George Vancouver (1985 — Ogilvie, Canada)
 George Vibert (1853 — Robert, France)
 George Will (1939 — Skinner, Canada)
 Georges de Cadoudel (1904 — Schwartz, France)
 Georges Vibert (1853 — Robert, France)

 Geraldine (1984 — Pearce, United Kingdom)
 Gertrud Kiese (1918 — Kiese, Germany),
 Gertrude Jekyll (1986 — Austin, United Kingdom)
 Ghislaine de Féligonde (1916 — Turbat, France)
 Gil Blas (1848 — France)
 Gilda (1887 — Geschwind, Austria-Hungary)
 Gina Lollobrigida (1989 — Meilland, France)
 Ginger Rogers (1969 — Boerner, USA)
 Gitte (1982 — Kordes, Germany)
 Givenchy (1985 — Christensen, USA)
 Gladys Harkness (1900 — Dickson, United Kingdom)
 Gloire de Chédane Guinoisseau  (1908 — Chédane Pajotin, France)
 Gneisenau (1924 — Lambert, Germany)
 Goethe (1911 — Lambert, Germany)
 Kurt Goldstein|Goldstein  (1983 — Cocker, United Kingdom)
 Gottfried Keller (1894 — Müller, Germany)
 Goubault (1835 — Hardy, France)
 Goya, Bees  (1976 — United Kingdom)
 Grace Abounding (1968 — Harkness, United Kingdom)
 Grace Darling (1884 — Bennett, United Kingdom)
 Grace de Monaco (1956 — Meilland, France)
 Gracie Allen
 Graf Fritz von Hochberg (1905 — Lambert, Germany)
 Graf Fritz von Schwerin (1916 — Lambert, Germany)
 Graf Lennart (1991 — Meilland, France)
 Graf Silva Tarouca (1915 — Lambert, Germany)
 Gräfin Chotek  (1900 — Geschwind, Austria-Hungary)

 Gräfin Chotek  (1911 — Kiese, Germany)
 Gräfin Sonja (1994 — Kordes, Germany)
 Gräfin Stefanie Wedel (1910 — Lambert, Germany)
 Graham Thomas (1983 — Austin, United Kingdom)
 Grandmère Jenny (1950 — Meilland, France)
 Grandpa Dickson (1966 — Dickson, United Kingdom)
 Granny (1991 — Olesen, Denmark)
 Gretel Greuel (1939 — Greuel, Germany)
 Grimm (1932 — Lambert, Germany)
 Griseldis (1895 — Geschwind, Austria-Hungary)
 Großherzog Ernst Ludwig (1989 — Müller, Germany)
 Großherzog Friedrich von Baden (1908 — Lambert, Germany)
 Großherzog von Oldenburg (1904 — Welter, Germany)
 Großherzog Wilhelm Ernst von Sachsen (1915 — Welter, Germany)
 Großherzogin Luise von Baden (1893 — Welter, Germany)
 Großherzogin Alexandra (1904  — Jacobs, Germany)
 Grossherzogin Feodora von Sachsen (1913 — Kiese, Germany)
 Großherzogin Marie (1912 — Jacobs, Germany)
 Großherzogin Viktoria Melitta (1898 — Lambert, Germany)
 Guillaume Kaempff  (1931 — Felberg, Germany)
 Gustav Grünerwald (1903 — Lambert, Germany)
 Gustel Mayer (1909 — Lambert, Germany)
 Gustav Sobry (1902 — Welter, Germany)
 Guy de Maupassant (1994 — Meilland, France)
 Guy Savoy (2002 — Delbard, France)
Top of page

H

 H. C. Andersen (Olesen, Denmark)
 H. F. Eilers (1914 — Lambert, Germany)
 Händel (1965 — McGredy, Ireland)
 Hannah Gordon (1973 — Kordes, Germany)
 Hanne Soenderhousen (1959 — Soenderhousen, Denmark) 
 Hans Rathgeb (2004 — Huber, Switzerland)
 Hans Rosenthal (1987 — Meilland, France)
 Harald Wohlfahrt (2003 — Delbard, France)
 Harry Maasz (1939 — Kordes, Germany)
 Harry Wheatcroft
 Hauff (1911 — Lambert, Germany)
 Hauptmann A. Steinsdorfer (1890 — Geschwind, Austria-Hungary)
 Heather Austin  (1996 — Austin, United Kingdom)
 Heather Muir (1957 - Sunningdale Nurseries, United Kingdom)
 Hedi Grimm (1970 — Scholle, Germany)
 Hedwig Reicher (1912 — Hinner, Germany)
 Heidi (1978 — Christensen, USA)
 Heidi Klum (1999 — Tantau, Germany)
 Hein Evers (1957 — Tantau, Germany)
 Heinrich Blanc (1994 — Hetzel, Germany)
 Heinrich Conrad Söth (1919 — Lambert, Germany)
 Heine (1912 — Lambert, Germany)
 Heinrich Karsch (1927 — Leenders (NL)
 Heinrich Münch (1911 — Hinner, Germany)
 Heinrich Schultheis (1882 — Bennett, United Kingdom)
 Heinrich Siesmayer (1996 — McGredy, New Zealand)
 Heinz Erhardt (1984 — Kordes, Germany)
 Heinz Winkler (Delbard, France)
 Helen Hawes (2012 — Burntwood, United Kingdom)
 Helen Hayes
 Helene von Zwehl (1915 — Lambert, Germany)
 Helene Welter (1903 — Welter, Germany)
 Helga  (II) (1975 — De Ruiter, The Netherlands)
 Helmut Kohl (1996 — Tantau, Germany)
 Helmut Schmidt (1979 — Kordes, Germany)
 Henri IV (1862 — Verdier, France)
 Henri Barruet (1918 — Barbier, France)
 Helene von Zwehl (1915 — Lambert, Germany)

 Henri de Toulouse-Lautrec (1993 — Meilland, France)
 Henri Fouquier (1854 — Philipps-Rix, France)
 Henri Martin (1863 — Laffay, France)
 Henri Matisse (1995 — Delbard, France)
 Henriette Boulogne (1845 — France)
 Henry Clay (Light pink Hybrid Spinosissima bred by Daniel Boll in the United States, 1854; introduced to France by Portemer Père in 1855 as "Souvenir de Henry Clay")
 Henry Fonda
 Henry Ford — (1927 — Devermann, USA)
 Henry Hudson (1976 — Svejda, Canada)
 Henry Kelsey
 Henry Nevard (1924 — Cant, Germany)
 Herkules (2007 — Kordes, Germany)
 Hermann Berger (1982 — Roter Oktober, East-Germany)
 Hermann Hesse 
 Hermann Kegel (1848 — Portemer, France)
 Hermann Kiese (1906 — Geduldig, Austria-Hungary)
 Hermann Lüder (1910 — Kiese, Germany)
 Hermann Raue (1905 — Lambert, Germany)
 Hermann Robinow (1918 — Lambert, Germany)
 Hermann Schmidt (1986 — Hetzel, Germany)
 Hermann Teschendorff (1950 — Berger, Germany)
 Herrin von Lieser (1905 — Lambert, Germany)
 Herrmann Coenemann (1907 — Welter, Germany)
 Herzog Friedrich von Anhalt (1906 — Welter, Germany)
 Herzog Johann Albrecht (1913  — Jacobs, Germany)
 Herzog Karl Eduard (1909 — Jacobs, Germany)
 Herzog Viktor von Ratibor (1918 — Welter, Germany)
 Herzog von Windsor (1968 — Tantau, Germany)
 Herzogin Marie von Ratibor (1898 — Lambert, Germany)
 Herzogin Marie Antoinette zu Mecklenburg (1911 — Jacobs, Germany)
 Herzogin von Calabrien (1914 — Lambert, Germany)
 Hiawatha (1904 — Walsh, USA)
 Hilda Murrell (1984 — Austin, United Kingdom)
 Hindenburg (1916 — Kiese, Germany)
 Hippolyte (Before 1842 — Parmentier, Belgium)
 Hoffmann von Fallersleben (1917 — Lambert, Germany)

 Hofgartendirektor Graebener (1899 — Lambert, Germany)
 Hofgärtner Kalb (1913 — Felberg, Germany)
 Homère (1858 — Moreau-Robert, France)
 Honest Abe (1978 — Christensen)
 Honoré de Balzac (1994 — Meilland, France)
 Honorine de Brabant (circa 1840)
 Hortense de Beauharnais (1834 — Vibert, France)
 Horace Vernet (1866 —  Guillot, France)
 Horstmanns Bergfeuer (1954 — Horstmann / Kordes, Germany)
 Hugh Dickson (1904 — Dickson, United Kingdom)
 Hume's Blush (1810 — Hume, United Kingdom)
Top of page

I

 Ida Costain (1955 - Brampton, Ontario, Canada)
 Ignasi Iglésias (1934 — Spain)
 Ilse Haberland (1956 — Kordes, Germany)
 Ilse Krohn (1964 — Kordes, Germany)
 Immortal Juno (1983 — Austin, United Kingdom)
 Impératrice Eugénie (1855 — Béluze, France)
 Impératrice Eugénie (1856 — Guillot, France)
 Impératrice Joséphine (before 1815 — Descemet, France)
 Indira (1973 — Hetzel, Germany)
 Infante Beatrice (1930 — Guillot, France)
 Ingrid Bergman (1984 — Olesen, Denmark)
 Ingrid Weibull (1980 - Tantau, Germany)
 Irene Churruca (1934 - Fojo, Spain)
 Irene von Dänemark (1948 — Poulsen, Denmark)
 Irène Watts (1896 — Guillot, France)
 Isobel Derby (1993 — Horner, United Kingdom)
 Isobel Harkness  (1957 — Harkness, United Kingdom)
Top of page

J
 J. H. Pemberton (1931 — Bentall, United Kingdom)
 J. J. Audubon (2006 — Shoup, USA)
 J. L. Monk (1923 — Timmermans, United Kingdom)

 J.P. Connell
 Climbing Jackie Moore (1957 — USA)
 Jacqueline du Pré (1989 — Harkness, United Kingdom)
 Jacqueline Humery (1995 - Lens, Belgium)
 Jacquenetta  (1983 — Austin, United Kingdom)
 Jacques Cartier (1868 -, Moreau-Robert, France)
 Jacques Esterel (1968 - Croix, France)
 Jacques Porcher (1914 — Guillot, France)
 James Galway (2000 —  Austin, United Kingdom)
 James Mason (1982 — Beales, United Kingdom)
 James Mitchell (1861 — Verdier, France)
 James Veitch (1854 — Verdier, France) 1864
 Jan Spek (1966 —  McGredy, Ireland)
 Jane Asher (1987 — Pearce, United Kingdom)
 Janet B. Wood (1989 — Beales, United Kingdom)
 Janetta (1995 — Sievers, Germany)
 Jayne Austin (1990 — Austin, United Kingdom)
 Jean Giono (1994 — Meilland, France)
 Jean Lafitte (1934 — Horvath, USA)
 Jean Stéphenne (2006 — Velle, Belgium)
 Jean Liabaud (1875 — Liabaud, France)
 Jeanne Bouyer (1877 — Gonod, France)
 Jeanne de Montfort (1851 — Robert, France)
 Jeanne Moreau (2005 — Meilland, France)
 Jeannie Deans (1895 — Penzance, United Kingdom)
 Jens Munk (Canada)
 Jenny Duval (before 1842 — France)
 Jeanne d'Arc (1818- Vibert, France)
 Jill Dando (1999 — Beales, United Kingdom)
 Jimmy Greaves (1940 — Gandy, United Kingdom)
 Joanna Hill (1927 — Hill, USA)
 Joasine Hanet (1847- Vibert, France),
 Johann Strauß (1993 — Meilland, France)
 Johannes Rau (2001 — Noack, Germany)
 Johannes Wesselhöft (1899 — Welter, Germany)
 John Bright (1878 — Paul, United Kingdom)
 John Cabot
 John Clare (1994 — Austin, United Kingdom)
 John Cook  (1917 — Krüger, Germany)
 John Davis (English explorer)
 John Franklin
 John F. Kennedy  (1965 — Boerner, USA)
 John Grooms (1993 — Beales, United Kingdom)
 John Hopper (1862 — Ward, United Kingdom)
 John S. Armstrong
 Johnnie Walker (1982 — Fryer, United Kingdom)
 José Carréras (1998 — Poulsen, Denmark)
 Josef Klimeš (1985 - Urban, Czech Republic)
 Joseph F. Lamb (1988 - Buck, United States)
 Joseph Liger (1909 — Barbier, France)
 Joseph's Coat (1969 — Swim/Armstrong, USA)
 Josephine Bruce (1950 — Bees, United Kingdom)
 Joséphine de Beauharnais (1823 -Vibert, France)
 Josephine Ritter (1900 — Geschwind, Austria-Hungary)
 Josie Whitney (2000 — Harkness, United Kingdom)
 Juan Francisco de la Bodega y Quadra Quadra Rose, Canada 
 Jubilé du Prince de Monaco (2000 — Meilland, France)
 Jude the Obscure (1995 — Austin, United Kingdom)
 Judy Garland (1978 — Harkness, USA)
 Jules Margottin (1853 —  Margottin, France)
 Julia Child
 Julia Festilla (1900 — Geschwind, Austria-Hungary)
 Julia Mannering (1895 — Penzance, United Kingdom)
 Julia's Rose (1976 — Wisbech Plant Co. Ltd., United Kingdom)
 Julie Andrews
 Julie de Mersan (1854 — Thomas, USA).
 Julien Potin (1927 — Pernet-Ducher, France)
 Juliet (1910 — Paul, United Kingdom)
 Juliette (1850 — Miellez, France)
 Juliette Gréco (1999 — Delbard, France)
 Julius Fabianics de Misefa (1890 — Geschwind, Austria-Hungary)
 June Whitfield (1925 — Harkness, United Kingdom)
 Juno (1832)
 Juno (II) (1847 — Laffay, France)
 Just Joey (1972 — Pawsey, United Kingdom)
 Justino Henriquez (1926 — Guillot, France)
 Justizrat Dr. Hessert (1918 — Lambert, Germany)
Top of page

K
 Kaiser Franz Joseph (1915 — Lambert, Germany)
 Kaiser Wilhelm I (1878 — Elze/Ruschpler, Germany)
 Kaiser Wilhelm II (1909 — Jacobs, Germany)
 Kaiserin Auguste Viktoria  (1891 — Lambert, Germany)
 Kaiserin Farah (1965 — Kordes, Germany)
 Kaiserin Friedrich (1889 — Drogemüller, Germany)
 Kaiserin Zita (1965 — Kordes, Germany)

 Kammersänger Terkal (1971 — Tantau, Germany)
 Kapitän von Müller (1915 — Lambert, Germany)
 Karen Blixen (1994 — Olesen, Denmark)
 Karl Foerster (1931 — Kordes, Germany)
 Karl Heinz Hanisch (1986 — Meilland, France)
 Karl Herbst (1950 — Kordes, Germany)
 Karl Höchst (1983 — Hetzel, Germany)
 Karl Ploberger (2007 — Kordes, Germany)
 Käte Felberg (1930 — Felberg, Germany)
 Katharina Mock (1942 — Mock, Germany)
 Katharina von Bora (2006 — Schultheis, Germany)
 Katharina Zeimet (1901 — Lambert, Germany)
 Käthe Duvigneau (1942 — Tantau, Germany)
 Kathleen (1922 — Pemberton, United Kingdom)
 Kathleen Ferrier (1952 — Buisman, Netherlands)
 Kathleen Harrop (1919 — Dickson, United Kingdom)
 Kathryn McGredy (1996 — McGredy, New Zealand)
 Kathryn Morley (1990 — Austin, United Kingdom)
 Kean (Laffay, France)
 Kessi (1999 — Schultheis, Germany)
 Kiese  (1910 — Kiese, Germany)
 Kirsten Klein (1995 — Scarman, United Kingdom)
 Kirsten Poulsen (1924 — Poulsen, Denmark)
 Kitchener of Khartoum (1917 — Dickson, United Kingdom)
 Kitty's Rose (2003 — Beales, United Kingdom)
 Klaus Groth (1951 — Tantau, Germany)
 Kleopatra 94 (1994 — v, Germany)
 Kletternde Hermann Robinow (1934 — Lambert, Germany)
 Kommerzienrat W. Rautenstrauch (1909 — Lambert, Germany)
 König Laurin (1910 —  Türke, Germany)

 König Ludwig (1994 — Tantau, Germany)
 Königin Beatrix (1983 — Kordes, Germany)
 Königin Carola von Sachen  (1904 — Türke, Germany)
 Königin Margarethe (1994 — Olesen, Denmark)
 Königin Maria Therese (1916 — Lambert, Germany)
 Königin Maria Therese (1916 — Lambert, Germany)
 Konrad Adenauer (1953 — Tantau, Germany)
 Konrad Henkel (1983 — Kordes, Germany)
 Körner (1914 — Lambert)
 Kronprinz Ruprecht (1915 — Lambert, Germany)
 Kronprinz Wilhelm (1916 — Lambert, Germany)
 Kronprinzessin Cecilie (1907 — Kiese, Germany)
 Kronprinzessin Viktoria (1888 — Vollert, Germany)
 Kronprinzessin Viktoria (II) (1986 — Hetzel, Germany)
Top of page

L

 L.D. Braithwaite
 Lady Banks (1807 — Boursault, France)
 Lady Curzon (1901 — Turner, United Kingdom)
 Lady Di (1982 — Huber, Switzerland)
 Lady Edgeworth David (1939 - Fitzhardinge, Australia)
 Lady Emma Hamilton (2005 — Austin, United Kingdom)
 Lady Emily Peel (1862 — Lacharme, France)
 Lady Gowrie (1938 - Fitzhardinge, Australia)
 Lady Gray (1905 — Geschwind, Austria-Hungary)
 Lady Helen Stuart (1887 — Dickson, United Kingdom)
 Lady Hillingdon (1910 — Lowe & Shawyer, United Kingdom)
 Lady Hillingdon Climbing (1917 — Hicks, United Kingdom)
 Lady Mary FitzWilliam (1882 — Bennett, United Kingdom)
 Lady Mavis Pilkington (1992 - Kordes, Germany)
 Lady of Megginch (2007 — Austin, United Kingdom)
 Lady Mitchell (1991 — Harkness, United Kingdom)
 Lady Monson (Monson, United Kingdom)
 Lady Penzance (1894 — Penzance, United Kingdom)
 Lady Romsey (1985 —  Beales, United Kingdom)
 Lady Sylvia
 Lady Ursula (1908 — Dickson, United Kingdom)
 Lamarque (1830 — France)
 Lambert Closse
 Laura Ashley (1991 — Warner, United Kingdom)
 Laura Ford (1990 — Warner, United Kingdom)
 Laure Davoust (1834 — Laffay, France)
 Laurent Carle (1907 — Pernet-Ducher, France)
 Laurent de Rille (1885 — Lévêque, France)
 Lawinia (1980 — Tantau, Germany)
 Lawrence Johnston (1923 — Pernet-Ducher, France)
 Leander (1982 — Austin, United Kingdom)
 LeAnn Rimes
 Léda (before 1838 — France)
 Leonardo da Vinci (1994 — Meilland, France)
 Leonie Lamesch (1899 — Lambert, Germany)
 Leonie Lambert (1913 — Lambert, Germany)
 Léontine Gervais (1903 — Barbier, France)
 Leopold Ritter (1900 — Geschwind, Austria-Hungary)
 Lessing (1914 — Lambert, Germany)
 Leveson Gower (1846 — Béluze, France)
 Lilian Austin (1973 — Austin, United Kingdom)
 Lilian Baylis (1996 — Harkness, United Kingdom)
 Lilli Marleen (1959 — Kordes, Germany)
 Lilli von Posern (1910 — Kiese, Germany)
 Lina Schmidt-Michel (1906 — Lambert, Germany)
 Linda Campbell (1990 — Moore, California, USA)
 Linda Porter (1957 — Spain)
 Line Renaud (2006 — Meilland, France)
 Lisbeth Stellmacher (1919 — Lambert, Germany)
 Lisbeth von Kamecke (1910 — Kiese, Germany)
 Liv Tyler (2005 — Meilland, France)
 Long John Silver (1934 — Horvath, (USA)
 Lord Byron (1991 — Meilland, France) 
 Lord Penzance (1894 — Penzance, United Kingdom)
 Lord Raglan (1854 — Guillot, France)
 Loreley 82 (1982 — Noack, Germany)
 Louis Bulliat (1867 — Gonod, France)
 Louis de Buade de Frontenac (Canada)
 Louis de Funès (1984 — Meilland, France)
 Louis Donadine (1887 — Gonod, France)
 Louis Gimard (1877 — Pernet-Ducher, France)
 Louis Kahle (1922 — Kiese, Germany)
 Louis Jolliet
 Louis Rödiger (1935 — Kordes, Germany)
Louis Rollet (1887 — Gonod, France)
Louis van Tyll (Before 1846)
Louis-Philippe (1824 — France)
Louisa Stone (1997 — Harkness, United Kingdom)
Louise Bugnet (1960 — Bugnet, Canada)
Louise Clements (1998 — Clements, USA)
Louise Cretté (1815 — Chambard, France)
Louise Hay (2008 — USA)

Louise Odier (1851 — Margottin, France)
Lucetta (1983 — Austin, United Kingdom)
Lucille Ball
Lucie Crampton (1960 — Kriloff, France)
Lucie Duplessis (1853 — Robert, France)
Lucien de Lemos (1905 — Lambert, Germany)
Lucy Ashton
Ludmilla (1968 — Laperrière, France)
Ludwig Möller (1915 — Kiese, Germany)
Luise Gimard Moosrose
Luise Krause (1930 — Krause, Germany)
Luise Lilia (1912 — Lambert, Germany)
Luna (1825 — Poulsen, Denmark)
Lydia (II) (1873 — Kordes, Germany)
Lydia Geschwind (1890 — Geschwind, Austria-Hungary)
Lydia Grimm (1907 — Geduldig, Germany)
Lynn Anderson
Top of page

M

Mabel Morrison (1878 — Broughton, United Kingdom)
Madame A. Meilland (1942 — Meilland, France)
 Madame Abel Chatenay (1894 — Pernet-Ducher, France)
 Madame Abel Chatenay (1917 — Page, United Kingdom)
 Madame Alfred Carrière (1879 — Schwartz, France)
 Madame Anna Bugnet (1866 — Gonod, France)
 Madame Antoine Mari (1901 — Mari/Japeau, France)
 Madame Ballu (1901 — l'Haÿ, France)
 Madame Bardou Job (1913 — Dubreuil, France)
 Madame Bérard (1915 — Levet, France)
 Madame Boll (1859 — Boll/Boeyeau, France)
 Madame Bouyer (1877 — Gonod, France)
 Madame Bovary (Delbard, France)
 Madame Bravy (1846 — Guillot, France)
 'Madame Caroline Testout' (1890 — Pernet-Ducher, France)
 Madame Caroline Testout Climbing (1901 — Chauvry, France)
 Madame Céline Touvais (1859 - Touvais, France)
 Madame Charles Baltet (1873 — Moreau-Robert, France)
 Madame Clémence Joigneau (1861 — Liabaud, France)
 Madame Clert (1868 — Gonod, France)
 Madame Creyton (1868 — Gonod, France)
 Madame d'Enfert (1904 — Vilin, France)
 Madame David (1885 — Pernet-Ducher, France)
 Madame de la Roche Lambert (1851 — Robert, France)
 Madame de Villars (1847 —  Béluze, France)
 Madame de Pompadour (1945 — Gaujard, France)
 Madame de Sansal (1850 — De Sansal, France)
 Madame de Tartas (1859 — Bernède, France)
 Madame Delbard (1980 — Delbard, France)
 Madame Denis (1872 – Gonod, France)
 Madame Edmond Rostand (1912 — Pernet-Ducher, France)
 Madame Edouard Herriot (1914 — Pernet-Ducher, France)
 Madame Edouard Herriot (1921 — Ketten, Luxemburg)
 Madame Edouard Ory (1854 — Robert, France)
 Madame Elie Lambert (1890 — Lambert, Germany)
 Madame Emma Combay (1872 — Gonod, France)
 Madame Ernest Calvat (1888 — Schwartz, France)
 Madame Ernest Levavasseur (1900 — Vigneron, France)
 Madame Eugène Chambeyran 1879 — Gonod, France)
 Madame Eugène Labruyère (1882/1883 — Gonod, France)
 Madame Eugène Savary (1873 — Gonod, France)
 Madame Eugénie Frémy (1885 — Verdier, France)
 Madame Eugénie Savary (1872 — Gonod, France)
 Madame Falcot (1858 — Guillot, France)
 Madame Ferdinand Jamin (1875 — Lédéchaux, France)
 Madame Figaro (Delbard, France)
 Madame Fillion (1865 — Gonod, France)
 Madame Gabriel Luizet (1877 — Liabaud, France)
 Madame Georges Bruant (1887 — Bruant, France)
 Madame Gonod (1875 — Gonod, France)

 Madame Grégoire Staechelin (1927 — Dot, France)
 Madame Grondier (1867 — Gonod, France)
 Madame Guillot de Mont Favez (1871 — Gonod, France)
 Madame Gustave Bonnet (1896 — Bizot, France)
 Madame Hardy (1832 — Hardy, France)
 Madame Hermann Stenger (1864 – Gonod, France)
 Madame Hippolyte Dumas (1924 — Guillot, France)
 Madame Hoste (1865 — Gonod, France)
 Madame Hoste (1887 — Guillot, France)
 Madame Isaac Péreire (1881- Garçon, Paris)
 Madame Jean Everaerts (1907 — Geduldig, Germany)
 Madame Jeanne Bouger 1876 — Gonod, France)
 Madame Joseph Schwartz (1880 — Schwartz, France)
 Madame Jules Bouché (1911 — Croibier, France)
 Madame Jules Gravereaux (1901 — Soupert & Notting, Luxembourg)
 Madame Knorr (1855 — Verdier, France)
 Madame Lacharme (1872 — Lacharme, France)
 Madame Laurette Messimy (1888 — Guillot, France)
 Madame Lauriol de Barny (1868 — Trouillard, France)
 Madame Legras de St. Germain (1848 — France)
 Madame Léon Pain (1904 — Guillot, France)
 Madame Léon Simon (1909 — Lambert, Germany)
 Madame Liabaud (1869 — Gonod, France)
 Madame Lombard (1878 — Lacharme, France)
 Madame Louis Donadine (1877 — Gonod, France)
 Madame Louis Laperrière (1951 — Laperrière, France)
 Madame Louis Léveque (1898 — Leveque, France)
 Madame Louise Piron (1903 — Piron-Médard, France)
 Madame Marie Garnier (1881 — Gonod, France)
 Madame Maurice Rivoire (1878 — Gonod, France)
 Madame Moreau (1864 — Gonod, France)
 Madame Moreau (1872 — Moreau-Robert, France)
 Madame Norbert Levavasseur (1903 — Levavasseur, France)
 Madame Paule Massad (1997 — Guillot-Massad, France)

 Madame Pierre Oger (1878 — Oger, France)
 Madame Plantier (1835 — Plantier, France)
 Madame Raymond Poincaré (1919 — Gravereaux, France)
 Madame Richter (1886 — Geschwind, Austria-Hungary)
 Madame Rival (1866 — Gonod, France)
 Madame Rollet (1875 — Gonod, France)
 Madame Sancy de Parabère (1874 — Bonnet, France)
 Madame Schultz (1856 — Béluze, France)
 Madame Ségond Weber (1908 — Soupert & Notting, France)
 Madame Sophie Charlotte (1986 — Weihrauch, Germany)
 Madame Soubeyran (1872 — Gonod, France)
 Madame Souveton (1874 — Pernet, France)
 Madame Suzanne Chavagnon (1887 — Gonod, France)
 Madame Victor Verdier (1863 — Verdier, France)
 Madame Wagram, Comtesse de Turenne (1894 — France)
 Madame Willermoz (1850–1853 — unknown parentage, France)
 Madame William Paul (II) (1869 — Moreau-Robert, France)
 Mademoiselle Blanche Lafitte (1851 — Pradel, France)
 Mademoiselle Cécile Brunner (1881 — France)
 Mademoiselle Claire Andruejol (1920 — Schwartz, France)
 Mademoiselle de Sombreuil (1850 — Robert, France)
 Mademoiselle Eugénie Verdier (1869 — Guillot fils, France)
 Mademoiselle Julia Dumonier (1879 — Gonod, France)
 Mademoiselle Marie Gonod (1871 — Gonod, France)
 Mademoiselle Marie Magat (1889 — Liabaud, France)
 Mademoiselle Philiberte Pellet 1873– Gonod, France)
 Mademoiselle Suzanne Bouyer (1879 — Gonod, France)
 Magda Zwerg (1904 — Jacobs, Germany)
Maja Oetker (1981 — Cocker, United Kingdom)
Major Franz Teirich (1888 — Geschwind, Austria-Hungary)
Mala Rubinstein (1971 —  Dickson, United Kingdom)
Malvina (1841 — Verdier, France)

 Mama Lamesch (1923 — Löbner/Lambert, Germany)
 Maman Cochet (1893 — Cochet, France) duftend
 Maman Cochet Climbing (1915 — Howard & Smith, USA)
 Manette (1820 — Lacaffe, France)
 Manou Meilland (1978 — Meilland, France)
 Manuel Canovas (1995 — Guillot-Massad, France)
 Marc-Antoine Charpentier (2005 — Massad, France)
 Marc Bolan (2012 — Cockers, United Kingdom)
  Marcel Bourgouin (1899 — Corboeuf, France)
 Marcel Pagnol (1996 — Meilland, France)
 Marchioness of Lorne (1889 — Paul, United Kingdom)
 Marco Polo (1991 — Meilland, France)
 Maréchal Davoust (1853 — Robert, France)
 Maréchal Niel (1864 — H & G Pradel, France)
 Margaret Dickson (1892 — Dickson, United Kingdom)
 Margaret McGredy (1927 — McGredy, Ireland)
 Margaret Merril (1977 — Harkness, United Kingdom)
 Margaret Thatcher (Named in Pattoki, Punjab, Pakistan)
 Margarete Gnau (1930 — Krause, Germany)
 Margarete Heike (1914 — Lambert, Germany)
 Margarita (1924 — Alfons, Germany)
 Marguerite de Roman (1882 — Schwartz, France)
 Maria (Sievers, Germany)
 Maria Bülow (1903 — Welter, Germany)
 Maria Hofker (1993 — Interplant, The Netherlands)
 Maria Liesa (1936 — Liebau, Germany)
 Maria Lisa (1925 — Alfons, Germany)
 Maria von Weber (1893 — Türke, Germany)
 Marianne Pfitzer (1902 — Jacobs, Germany)
 Margo Koster (1931 — Koster, Germany)
 Marguerite Hilling (1959 — Hilling, United Kingdom)
 Maria Callas (1965 — Meilland, France)
 Mariandel (1985 —  Kordes, Germany)
 Maribel (1991 — Cocker, United Kingdom)
 Marie Accarie (1872 — Guillot, France)
 Marie Antoinette (1968 — Armstrong, USA)
 Marie Antoinette II (2003 — Tantau, Germany)

 Marie Baumann (1863 — Baumann, France)
 Marie Bugnet (1963 — Bugnet, Canada)
 Marie Claire Climbing (1944 — Meilland, France)
 Marie Curie (1997 — Meilland, France)
 Marie d'Orléans (1883 — Nabonnand, France)
 Marie de Blois (1852 — Robert, France)
 Marie de Bourgogne (1853 — Robert, France)
 Marie de Saint Jean  (1852 — Damaizin, France)
 Marie Dermar (1889 — Geschwind, Austria-Hungary) 
 Marie Faist (1925 — Berger, Germany)
 Marie François Sadi Carnot (1894 — Pernet-Ducher, France)
 Marie Geschwind (1889 — Geschwind, Austria-Hungary)
 Marie Gouchault (1927 — Turbat, France)
 Marie Helene (1991 — Weihrauch, Germany)
 Marie Henriette Gräfin Chotek (1920 — Lambert, Germany)
 Marie Jeanne (1913 — Turbat, France)
 Marie Lambert (1889 — Lambert),
 Marie Louise (1813, France)
 Marie Louise Pernet (1876 — Pernet, France)
 Marie Herzogin von Anhalt (1909 — Jacobs, Germany)
 Marie Pavié (1888 — Allégatière, France)
 Marie-Luise Marjan (1999 — Kordes, Germany)
 Marie Tudor (before 1846 — France)
 Marie-Victorin (Canada)
 Marietta Biolley (1875 — Gonod, France)
 Marilyn Monroe (Weeks, USA)
 Marinette (1995 — Austin, United Kingdom)
 Marion (1956 — De Ruiter, The Netherlands)
 Marion Harkness (1979 — Harkness, United Kingdom)
 Marion Hess (1981 — Hetzel, Germany)
 Marjorie Fair (1978 — Harkness, United Kingdom)
 Marjorie Marshall (1996 — Harkness, United Kingdom)
 Marjorie Proops (1969 — Harkness, United Kingdom)

 Mark Twain (II) (2000 — Huber, Switzerland)
 Marlena
 Marlene Charell (2007 — Wänninger, Germany)
 Marlena (1864 — Kordes, Germany)
 Marquesa de Urquijo (1940 — Camprubi, Spain) 
 Martha (II) (1912 — Zeiner, France)
 Martha Lambert (1936 — Lambert)
 Martin Frobisher (1968 — Svejda, Canada)
 M. Geier (1929 — Felberg, Germany)
 Martin Liebau (1930 — Kiese, Germany)
 Martine Guillot (1996 — Guillot-Massad, France)
 Marty (II) (1947 — Pearce, United Kingdom)
 Mary Donaldson (1984 — Cants, United Kingdom)
 Mary Hayley Bell (1989 — Kordes, Germany)
 Mary MacKillop (1985 — Australia)
 Mary Magdalene (1998 — Austin, United Kingdom)
 Mary Manners (1970 — Leicester Rose Company, United Kingdom)
Mary Margaret McBride (1943 - USA) 
 Mary, Queen of Scots  (19th century)
 Mary Webb (1984 — Austin, United Kingdom)
 Master Hugh (1966 — Mason, United Kingdom)
 Dearest (1960 — Dickson, United Kingdom)
 Maude Elizabeth (2000 — Beales, United Kingdom)
 Maupertuis (1888 — Moreau-Robert, France)
 Maurice Bernardin (1861 — Granger/Lévêque, France)
 Maurice Utrillo (2004 — Delbard France)
 Max Graf (1919 — Bowditsch, USA)
 Max Hesdörffer  (1902 — Jacobs, Germany)
 Max Krause (1930 —  Krause, Germany)
 Max Schmeling (1873 — Tantau, Germany)
 Mayor of Casterbridge
 Mécène (1846, Vibert, France)
 Mechtilde von der Neuerburg (1920 —  Boden, Germany)
 Meg Merrilies (1894 — Penzance, United Kingdom)
 Mercedes (1886 — Geschwind, Austria-Hungary)
 Michael Crawford

 Michel Bras (2002 — Delbard, France)
 Michel Dupré (1876 — Gonod, France)
 Michelangelo (1997 — Meilland, France)
 Michele Meilland (1945 — Meilland, France)
 Mildred Scheel  (1976 — Tantau, Germany)
 Miller Hayes (1873 — Verdier,  France)
 Mimie Mathy (1999 — Dorieux, France)
 Minnehaha (1905 — Walsh, USA)
 Minette (1819 — Vibert, France)
 Minerve (1868 — Gonod, France)
 Minnie Pearl
 Miranda (1869 — de Sansal, France)
 Miss Alice (2000 — Austin, United Kingdom)
 Miss Edith Cavell (1917 — De Ruiter, The Netherlands)
 Miss Willmott (1916 — McGredy, Ireland)
 Mister Lincoln (1964 — Swim, USA)
 Montezuma (1955 — Swim, USA)
 Moje Hammarberg (1931 — Hammarberg)
 Monica Bellucci (1940 before 2010 — Meilland, France)
 Monsieur Boncenne (1864 — Liabaud, France)
 Monsieur Cordier 1871 — Gonod, France)
 Monsieur de Morand (1891 — Schwartz, France)
 Monsieur Fillion (1876 — Gonod, France)
 Monsieur Jules Lemaître (1890 — Vigneron, France)
 Monsieur Lapierre (1878 — Gonod, France)
 Monsieur le Capitaine Louis Frère (1883 — Vigneron. France)
 Monsieur Rambaux'. France, 1872
 Monsieur Tillier (1801 — Bernaix, France)
 Mortimer Sackler  (2002 — Austin, United Kingdom)
 Mountbatten (1982 — Harkness, United Kingdom)
 Mozart (1937 — Lambert, Germany)
 Mr. Lincoln (1964 — Swim & Weeks, United States)
 Mrs. Aaron Ward (1907 — Pernet-Ducher, France)
 Mrs Aaron Ward (1922 — Dickson, United Kingdom)
 Mrs Anthony Waterer  (1898 — Waterer, United Kingdom)
 Mrs. B. R. Cant (1901 — Cant, USA)
 Mrs Billie Crick (1995 — Scarman, United Kingdom)
Mrs Baker Turner (1876 — United Kingdom)
Mrs. Charles Bell (1917)
Mrs. Chiang Kai-Shek (1942 — Carl G. Duehrsen)
Mrs Colville (Colville, United Kingdom)
Mrs Doreen Pike (1989 — Austin, United Kingdom)
Mrs. F. F. Prentiss (1925 — Horvath)
Mrs F. W. Flight (1905 — Cutbush, United Kingdom)
Mrs. Franklin D. Roosevelt (1933 — Traendly & Schenck, USA)
Mrs Fred Danks (1951 — Clark, Australia)
Mrs. Harkness (1893 — Harkness, United Kingdom)
Mrs Herbert Stevens (1922 — Pernet-Ducher, France)
Mrs. Iris Clow (1994 — Harkness, United Kingdom)
Mrs John Laing (1887 — Bennett, United Kingdom)
Mrs O. G. Orpen (Orpen, United Kingdom)
Mrs. Oakley Fisher (1921 — Cant, USA)
Mrs Paul (1891, Paul, United Kingdom)
Mrs Quickly (1995 — Austin, United Kingdom)
Mrs Sam McGredy (1929 — McGredy, Ireland)
Mrs Sam McGredy (1937 — Buisman, Netherlands)
Mrs R.G. Sharman-Crawford (1894 — Dickson, United Kingdom)
Mrs Theodore Roosevelt (1902 — Hill, USA)
Mrs W. J. Grant (1895 — Dickson (United Kingdom)
Ms Amanda Coombes (2005 - Newman, Australia)
Ms Rhonda Louise (2010 - Newman, Australia)
Ms Wendy Poulier (2004 - Newman, Australia)
Muriel (1991 — Harkness, United Kingdom)
Mutter Brada (1934 — Brada, Czechoslovakia)
Top of page

N

Napoleon
Nancy Hayward (1937 - Clark, Australia)
Nancy Reagan (2005 — Zary, USA)
Nancy Steen (1976)
Natalie Böttner (1909 - Böttner, Germany)
Nathalie Nypels (1919 - Leenders, Netherlands)
Newton (1869 — Gonod, France)
Niccolò Paganini (1991 — Meilland, France)
Nicola Welter (1903 — Jacobs, Germany)
Niles Cochet (1906 - California Nursery Co., USA)
Nina Weibull (1961 - Poulsen, Denmark)
Niobe (1895 — Geschwind, Austria-Hungary)
Nozomi (1968 — T. Onodera, Japan)
Nymphe Egeria (1891 — Geschwind, Austria-Hungary)
Nymphe Teplá (1886 — Geschwind, Austria-Hungary)
Top of page

O

Obergärtner Franz Joost (1902 — Geschwind, Austria-Hungary)
Oberhofgärtner A. Singer (1904 — Lambert, Germany)
Octavia Hill (1995 — Harkness, United Kingdom)
Odette de Champdivers (before 1848)
Ökonomierat Echtermayer (1913 — Lambert, Germany)
Olive (1892 — Harkness, United Kingdom)
Oliver Delhomme (1861 — V. Verdier, France)
Olivia Newton-John
Omar Khayyam (1893) 
Ophelia (1912 — W. Paul, France)
Ormiston Roy (Canada)
Oscar Kordel (1897 — Lambert, Germany)
Otto von Bismarck (1908 — Kiese, Germany)
Otto von Weddingen (1904 — Lambert, Germany)
Our Molly (1994 — Dickson, United Kingdom)
Ovid (1890 — Geschwind, Austria-Hungary)
Top of page

P

Paddy McGredy (1962 — McGredy, United Kingdom)
Paganini (1989 — Lens, Belgium)
Paola (1981 — Tantau, Germany)
Papageno (1989 — McGredy) 
Papa Gontier (1882 — Nabonnand, France)
Papa Gouchault (1922 — Turbat, France)
Papa Lambert (1899 — Lambert, Germany)
Papa Meilland (1963 — Meilland, France)
Papa Schneider (1961 — Kriloff, France)
Papi Delbard  (1995 — Delbard, France)
Parmentier (1847 — Moreau & Robert, France)
Pat Austin (1995 — Austin, United Kingdom) 1995
Pat James (1991 — Harkness, United Kingdom)
Paul Bocuse (1997 — Guillot-Massad, France)
Paul Cézanne (1995 — Delbard, France)
Paul Crampel (1930 — Kluis & Konig, The Netherlands / Kordes, Germany)
Paul Kadalozigue (1912 — Lambert, Germany)
Paul Lédé Climbing (1902 —  Lowe & Shawyer, United Kingdom)
Paul McCartney (1991 — Meilland, France)
Paul Noël (1913 — Tanne, France)
Paul Neyron (1869 — Levet, France)
Paul Ricard (1991 — Meilland, France)
Paul Ricault  (1845 — Portemer, France)
Paul Shirville (1983 — Harkness, United Kingdom)
Paul Transon (1900 — Barbier, France)
Paula Clegg (1912 — Kiese, Germany)
Pearlie Mae (1981 - Buck, United States)
Peer Gynt (1968 — Kordes, Germany)
Peggy Lee (1983 – Armstrong, United States)
Pelé
Pélisson (1848 - Vibert, France)
Penelope (1924 — Pemberton, United Kingdom)
Penelope Keith (1983 — McGredy, New Zealand)
Percy Izzard (1936 — H. Robinson)
Pergolèse (1850 — Moreau Robert, France)
Pernille Poulsen (1965 — Poulsen (Denmark)
Peter Beales (2000 — Clements, USA)
Peter Frankenfeld (1966 — Kordes, Germany)
Peter Lambert (Jacobs, Germany)
Peter Rosegger (1914 — Lambert, Germany)
Philippe Candeloro (2009 — Guillot, France)
Philipp Paulig (1908 — Lambert, Germany)

Philippe Noiret (1998 - Meilland, France)
Philippine Lambert (1903 — Lambert, Germany)
Phyllis Bide (1923 — Bide, United Kingdom)
Picasso (1971 — McGredy, Ireland)
Pierre Cagnaire (2003 — Delbard, France)

Pierre-Auguste Renoir (1995 — Meilland, France)
Pierre de Ronsard (1985 -  Meilland, France)
Pigalle 85 (1984 — Meilland, France)
Pius IX (1849 — Vibert, France)
Plomin (1951 — Tantau, Germany)
Pompadour (1979 —  Murray)
Pope John Paul II (2006 - Jackson and Perkins, USA)
Portland (1782 — Brunton, United Kingdom)
Président Dutailly (1888 — Dubreuil, France)

Président Gausen (1862 —  H & G Pradel, France)
President Herbert Hoover (1930 — Coddington, USA)
President Herbert Hoover (1931 — B.R. Cant, USA)
Président Lincoln (1863 — Granger, France)
Président Schlachter (1872 — Verdier, France)
Prince Camille de Rohan (1861 — Verdier, France)
Prince Caspian
Prince Charles (1842 — Luxemburg)
Prince Charles d'Aremberg (1877 — Soupert & Notting, Luxemburg)
Prince de Bulgarie (1900 — Pernet-Ducher, France)
Prince Eugène de Beauharnais (1864 — Moreau-Robert, France)
Prince Frédéric (1840 — Parmentier, Belgium)
Prince Napoléon (1864 — Pernet-Ducher, France)
Princess Alexandra (1998 — Olesen, Denmark)
Princess Alice (1985 — Harkness, United Kingdom) 
Princess Aiko (2002 — Keisei, Japan)
Princess Caroline of Monaco (1988 — Meilland)
Princess Louise (1828 — Jacques, France)
Princess Marie (1829 —  Jacques, France)
Princess Margaret (1969 — Meilland, France)
Princess Mary of Cambridge (1867 —  Paul, United Kingdom)
Princess Michael of Kent (1979 — Harkness, United Kingdom)
Princess de Monaco (1982 — Meilland, France)
Princess of Wales (1871 — Laxton, United Kingdom)
Princess of Wales (1997 — Harkness, United Kingdom) 
Princess Royal (1992 — Dickson, United Kingdom)
Princess Tomohito of Mikasa  (2003 — United Kingdom)
Princesse de Béarn (1885 — Lévêque, France)
Princesse de Lamballe (France) 
Princesse de Vaudémont (1854 — Moreau/Robert, France)
Princesse Marie-Adélaïde de Luxembourg
Princesse Marie Dolgorouky (1878 — Gonod, France)
Prinz Rupert (1910 — Lambert, Germany)
Prinzessin Adolf zu Schaumburg-Lippe (1913 — Lambert, Germany)
Prinzessin Hildegard von Bayern (1914 — Lambert, Germany)
Prior M. Oberthau
Professor Gnau (1928 — Tantau, Germany)
Professor Knöll (1964 — W. Berger, German Democratic Republic)
Prolifera Redouté (1824 — France)
Prospero (1982 — Austin, United Kingdom)
Psyche (1899 — Paul, United Kingdom)
Puccini (1984 — Lens, Belgium)
Top of page

Q

Queen Alexandra (1918 — McGreedy, Ireland)
Queen Charlotte (1989 — Harkness, United Kingdom)
Queen of Denmark (1826 — Booth, Denmark)
Queen Elizabeth I (1800 — Du Pont,  France)
Queen Elizabeth (1954 — Lammerts, USA)
Queen Elizabeth II Silver Jubilee (1978 — Cocker, United Kingdom)
Queen Elizabeth II Ruby Anniversary (1993 — Harkness, United Kingdom)
Queen Mother (1991 — Kordes, Germany)
Queen Nefertiti (1988 — Austin, United Kingdom)
Queen Sirikit (1968 —  Andre Hendricx)
Queen of Sweden (2004 — Austin, United Kingdom)
Queen Victoria (1851 — Fontaine/A. Paul, United Kingdom)
Queen Victoria (1872 — Labruyère/Schwartz, France)
Top of page

R

Rabelais II (1997 — Meilland, France)
Rachel Crawshay (1977 — Harkness, United Kingdom)
Raphael (III) (1856 — Robert, France)
Ravel (1988 — Lens, Belgium)
Reba McEntire (1998 — McGredy, New Zealand)
Régine Crespin (1990 — Delbard, France)
Rebecca Claire (1986 — Law, United Kingdom)
Reichsgraf von Kesselstatt (1898 — Lambert, Germany)
Reichspräsident von Hindenburg (1933 — Lambert, Germany)
Regierungsrat Rottenberger (1926 — Praskac, Austria)
Reine Olga de Württemberg (1881 — Nabonnand, France)
Reine Victoria (1872 — Schwartz, France)
Rembrandt (1883 — Moreau-Robert, France)
Renata Tebaldi (1989 — Delbard, France)
René André (1901 — Barbier, France)
René d'Anjou (1853 — Robert, France)
René Goscinny (2005 — Meilland, France)
Resi Bindseil (1913 — Lambert, Germany)
Richard Elbel (1927 — Elbel, Germany)
Richard Strauss (1989 — Noack) 
Richard Wagner (1893 — Türke, Germany)
Rob Roy (1971 — Cocker, United Kingdom)
Robert Bäßler (1905 — Hinner, Germany)
Robert Betten (1920 — J.C. Schmidt, Germany)
Robert Fortune (1853 — Moreau & Robert, France)
Robert le Diable (Before 1837 — France)
Robin Hood (1927 — Pemberton, United Kingdom)
Rodin (1990 — Meilland, France)
Roger Lambelin (1890 — Schwartz, France)
Roman Herzog (1999 — Noack, Germany)
Ronald Reagan (2005 — Zary, USA)
Roncall (1997 — Noack, Germany)
Roosevelt (1922 — Lambert, Germany)
rosa moyesii (1894 — Hemsley/Wilson, Canada)
Rose Benary (1908 — Lambert, Germany)
Rosel Klemm (1904 — Hinner, Germany)
Rosemarie Viaud (1924 — Igoult, France)
Rosemary Foster (1997 — Foster, United Kingdom)
Rosemary Harkness (1985 — Harkness, United Kingdom)
Rosenpfarrer Meyer (1930 — Soupert, Luxembourg)
Rosenprofessor Sieber (1997 — Kordes, Germany)
Rosi Mittermaier (1977 — Kordes, Germany)
Rosie O'Donnell (1998 — Winchell, USA)
Rosiériste Chauvry (1885 — Gonod, France)
Rosomane Gravereaux (1899 — Soupert & Notting, Luxembourg)
Roy Black (1993 — Olesen, Denmark)
Royal William (1987 — Kordes, Germany)
Rubens (1859 — Moreau-Robert, France)
Rübezahl (1917 — Krüger, Germany)
Rückert (1914 — Lambert, Germany)
Rudolf von Bennigsen (1932 — Lambert, Germany)
Ruskin (18928 — Van Fleet, USA)
Top of page

S

Saint Exupery (1961 — Delbard, France)
Sally Holmes 1976 — Holmes, United Kingdom)
Sally's Rose  (1994 — Cants, United Kingdom)
Samuel de Champlain (Canada)
Samuel Holland (1991 — Ogilvie, Canada)
Samuel Pepys (1934 — Cant, United Kingdom)
Sankta Rita (1922 — Alfons, Germany)
Santa Tereza d'Avila (1959 — Moreira da Silva, Portugal)
Santana (1985 — Tantau, Germany)
Sappho (Before 1817 — France)
Sarah (1986 — Meilland, France)
Sarah van Fleet (1926 — Van Fleet, USA)
Scarlett Queen Elizabeth (1963 — Dickson, United Kingdom)
Schiller (1913 — Lambert), Germany)
Schneewittchen (1901 — Lambert, Germany)
Schneewittchen Climbing (1970 — Kordes, Germany)
Schön Ingeborg (1921 — Kiese, Germany)
Sebastian Kneipp (1997 — Kordes, Germany)
Sénateur Amic (1924 — Nabonnand, France)
Senator Burda (1988 — Meilland, France)
Serafina Longa (1933 - Fojo, Spain)
Sharifa Asma (1989 — Austin, United Kingdom)
Sheila MacQueen (1994 — Harkness, United Kingdom)
Sibelius (II) (1984 — Lens, Belgium)
Signe Relander (1928 — Poulsen, Denmark)
Signora Piero Puricelli (1935 — Aicardi, Italy)
Simon Bolivar (1966 - Armstrong, USA) 
Simone de Nanteuil (1925 — Schwartz, France)
Sir Cedric Morris (1979 — Morris/Beales, United Kingdom)
Sir Clough (1985 — Austin, United Kingdom)
Sir Edward Elgar (1982 — Austin, United Kingdom)
Sir Frederick Ashton (1985 — Beales, United Kingdom)
Sir Walter Raleigh (II) (1985 — Austin, United Kingdom)
Sir Winston Churchill (1955 — Dickson, United Kingdom)
Sissel Kyrkjebø (1969 — Bergen, Norway)
Soham Rose (2003 — Harkness, United Kingdom)
Sonia Meilland (1974 — Meilland, France)
Sonia Meilove (2000 — Meilland, France)
Sonia Rykiel (1995 — Guillot-Massad, France)
Sophie de Marsilly (1863 — Moreau-Robert France)
Soupert et Notting (1867 — Pernet-Ducher, France)
Souvenir d'Adolphe de Charvoik (1911 — France)

Souvenir d'Alphonse Lavallée (1884 — Verdier, France)
Souvenir de Christophe Cochet (1894 — Cochet, France)
Souvenir de Claudius Pernet (1920 — Pernet-Ducher, France)
Souvenir de George Pernet (1927 — Pernet-Ducher, France)
Souvenir de Jeanne Balandreau (1899 — Robichon, France)
Souvenir de Julie Gonod 1871 — Gonod, France)
Souvenir de la Reine d'Angleterre (1855 — Cochet, France)
Souvenir de Labruyère (1885 — Gonod, France)
Souvenir de Léon Gambetta (1883 — Gonod, France)
Souvenir de Louis Amade (2000 — Delbard, France)
Souvenir de Madame Auguste Charles  (1866 — Moreau-Robert, France)
Souvenir de Madame Boullet (1921 — Pernet-Ducher, France)
Souvenir de Madame Bruel (1889 — Levet, France)
Souvenir de Madame de Corval 1867 — Gonod, France)
Souvenir de Madame Hélène Lambert (1885 — Gonod, France)
Souvenir de Madame Robert (1879 — Moreau-Robert, France)
Souvenir de Madame H. Thuret (1922 — Texier, France)
Souvenir de Marcel Proust (1993 — Delbard, France)
Souvenir de Philémon Cochet (1899 — Cochet, France)
Souvenir de Pierre Notting (1902 — Soupert & Notting, Luxembourg)
Souvenir de Pierre Vibert (1867 — Moreau-Robert, France)
Souvenir de Victor Hugo (1885 — Pernet, France)
Souvenir du Baron de Rothschild (1869 - Avoux & Crozy, France)
Souvenir du Docteur Jamain (1865 — Lacharme, France)

Souvenir du Président Carnot  (1894 — Pernet-Ducher, France)
Souvenir du Président Lincoln (1865—Moreau-Robert)
Souvenir du Rosiériste Gonod (1889 — Ducher, France)
St. Anne (Before 1919 — Campbell, Ireland)
St. Boniface (1980 — Kordes, Germany)
St. Bruno (1985 — Hallows/Sealand, United Kingdom)
St. Cecilia (1987 — Austin, United Kingdom)
St. Christopher (1996 — Harkness, United Kingdom)
St. John (1994 — Harkness, United Kingdom)
St. Lucia (1973 — Tantau, Germany)
St. Nicholas (1950, Hilling, United Kingdom)
St. Patrick (1991 — Strickland, USA)
Simon Fraser Canada
St. Swithun (1993 — Austin, United Kingdom)
Staatspräsident Päts (1937 – Germany, Christoph Weigand)
Stadkassierer Wilhelm Liffa (1889 — Geschwind, Austria-Hungary)
Stadtrat F. Kähler (1905 — Geduldig, Austria-Hungary)
Steffi Graf (1993 — Hetzel, Germany)
Stéphanie Charreton (1886 — Gonod, France)
Studienrat Schlenz (1926 — Lambert)
Sue Hipkin (1997 — Harkness, United Kingdom)
Sue Ryder (1983 — Harkness, United Kingdom)
Susan Hampshire (1974 — Paolino/Meilland, France)
Svaty Václav (1936 Berger, Czechoslovakia)
Sylvie Vartan
Top of page

T

Tabitha (2014 - Bannister, Dronfield, United Kingdom)
Taglioni (1833 or earlier)
Tania Verstak (1962 — Armbrust, Australia)
Tchaikovski (1999 — Meilland, France)
Teresa Scarman (1996 — Ferguson/Scarman, United Kingdom)
Tess of the d'Urbervilles (1998 — Austin, United Kingdom)
Thalia (1895 — Schmitt/Lambert, Germany)
Thalia Remontant (1903 — Lambert, Germany)
Thalie La Gentille (cca. 1800 — France)
The McCartney Rose (1991 — Meilland, France)
The Miller (1970 — Austin, United Kingdom)
The Queen Alexandra Rose (1918 — McGredy, Ireland)
Thelma Barlow (2001 — Fryers, Cheshire)
Thérèse Bugnet (1950 — Bugnet, Canada)
Therese Zeimet-Lambert (1923 — Lambert, Germany)
Thisbe (1918 — Pemberton, United Kingdom)
Thomas Barton (1988 — Meilland, France)
Thor (1940 — Horvath, USA)
Tiergartendirektor Timm (1944 — Kordes, Germany)
Till Uhlenspiegel (1950 — Kordes, Germany)
Tinkerbell (1992 — Schuurman, New Zealand)
Tino Rossi (1990 — Meilland, France)
Titian (1950 — Riethmüller, Australia)
Tom Brown (1964 — LeGrice, United Kingdom)
Tom Wood (1896 — Dickson, United Kingdom)
Toulouse Lautrec (1994 — Meilland, France)
Tracey Wickham (1984 — Welsh, Australien)
Trevor Griffiths (1994 — Austin, United Kingdom)
Troilus (1983 — Austin, United Kingdom)
Turenne (1846 - Vibert, France)
Top of page

U

Uhland (1917 — Lambert)
Ulrich Brunner Fils (1882 — Levet, France)
Uncle Walter? (1963 — McGredy, Ireland)
Undine (1901 —  Jacobs, Germany)
Urdh (1930 — Tantau, Germany)
Uwe Seeler (1970 — Kordes, Germany)
Top of page

V
Van Artevelde (1847 — Parmentier, France)
Van Gogh (1996 — Williams, USA)
Van Huysum (1845 — Parmentier, France)
Venus (before 1817 — France)
Venus (1904 — Welter, Germany)
Verdi (1960 — Dorieux, France)
Verdi II (1984 — Lens, Belgium)
Vick's Caprice (1891 — Vick, USA)
Vicomte Douglas (1871 — Gonod, France)
Vicomtesse de Bernis (1884 — Nabonnand, France)
Vicomtesse Decazes (1844 — Pradel, France)
Vicomtesse Douglas (1862 — Gonod, France)
Victor Hugo (1884 — Schwartz, France)
Victor Parmentier (1847 — Parmentier, France)
Vincente Peluffo (1902 — Lévêque, France)
Violet Carson (1964 — McGredy, Ireland)
Violette Bouyer (1881 — Lacharme, France)
Virginia R. Coxe (1897 — Geschwind, Austria-Hungary)
Viscountess Folkestone (1886 — Bennett, United Kingdom)
Von Hardenberg (1915 — Lambert, Germany)
Von Scharnhorst (1921 — Lambert, Germany)
Top of page

W
Weisse Cécile Brunner (1909 — Fauqué, France)
Weisse Max Graf (1983 — Kordes, Germany)
Wendy Cussons (1963 — Gregory, United Kingdom)
Wenzel (1902 — Geschwind, Austria-Hungary)
Werner von Blon (1993 — Hetzel, Germany)
Wieland (1916 — Lambert, Germany)
Wilhelm Frank (1910 — Welter, Germany)
Wilhelm Hansmann (1955 — Kordes, Germany)
Wilhelm Kordes (1922 — Kordes, Germany)
Will Alderman (1949 — Skinner)
Will Scarlet (1947 — Hilling, United Kingdom)

Willi Maass (1942 — Krause, Germany)
William III
William Allen Richardson (1878 — Pernet-Ducher, France)
William and Mary (1988 — Beales, United Kingdom)
William Baffin
William Booth
William Christie (1999 — Guillot, France)
William Francis Bennett (1884 — Bennett, United Kingdom)
William Grant (1915 —  Schoener, Germany)
William Jesse (1838 — Laffay, France)
William Lobb (1855 — Laffay, France) 1855  
William Morris (1998 — Austin, United Kingdom)
William Shakespeare (1987 — Austin, United Kingdom)
William Shakespeare 2000 (2000 — Austin, United Kingdom)
Wimi (1983 — Tantau, Germany)
Wilona (Sievers, Germany)
Wise Portia (1982 — Austin, United Kingdom)
Top of page

X
Top of page
Xu Gui Hua (2004 - Newman, Australia)

Y

Yolande d'Aragon (1843 — Vibert, France)
Youki San (1965 — Meilland, France)
Ypsilanti (1821 — Vibert, France)
Yves Piaget (1984 — Meilland, France)
Yvette Scarman (1995)
Yvonna (1995 — Sievers, Germany)
Yvonne Rabier (1911 — Turbat, France)
Top of page

Z

Zara Hore-Ruthven (1932 - Clark, Australia)
Zenobia (1892 — Paul, United Kingdom)
Zéphirine Drouhin (1868 — Bizot, France)
Zuo Shuang (1999 — Newman, Australia)
Zhong Lei (2010 — Chengdu, China)
Zoé (1830 — Vibert, France)
Zorina (1963 — Boerner, USA)
Top of page

See also
 Lists of cultivars
 Rose
 List of Rosa species
 Garden roses
 Rose garden
 Rose trial grounds
 Rose show

References

Further reading

External links

helpmefind.com
Collection of Roses
Find My Roses Index
Hardy Roses including Antique Old Garden Roses, Shrub, and Species Roses
Infojardin
Namen der Rosen
Peter Beales Roses
Welt der Rosen
World Federation of Rose Societies

Lists of cultivars

Rose cultivars